= Leiostyla concinna =

Conservation status
- Endangered (IUCN 3.1)

Scientific classification
- Kingdom: Animalia
- Phylum: Mollusca
- Class: Gastropoda
- Order: Stylommatophora
- Family: Lauriidae
- Genus: Leiostyla
- Species: L. concinna

Binomial name
- Leiostyla concinna (R.T. Lowe, 1852)

Species of gastropod

Leiostyla concinna is a species of land snail in the family Lauriidae. It is endemic to Madeira.

This snail is found on the mountain summits of Madeira, where it lives in moist leaf litter on rocky cliffs near streams. It was listed as a vulnerable species by the International Union for Conservation of Nature until 2013, when it was uplisted to endangered status because of recent wildfires in its habitat. It may also be impacted by overgrazing in the area.
