= Leiostyla ferraria =

Conservation status
- Vulnerable (IUCN 3.1)

Scientific classification
- Kingdom: Animalia
- Phylum: Mollusca
- Class: Gastropoda
- Order: Stylommatophora
- Family: Lauriidae
- Genus: Leiostyla
- Species: L. ferraria

Binomial name
- Leiostyla ferraria Lowe, 1852

Species of gastropod

Leiostyla ferraria is a species of land snail in the family Lauriidae. It is endemic to Porto Santo Island in the Madeira archipelago.

The range of this species is limited to two hills on the western end of the island. It lives in leaf litter and rock cracks in grassland habitat. Its range is not protected, but there are few immediate threats to the habitat and the population is thought to be stable.
