= Leiostyla vincta =

Conservation status
- Least Concern (IUCN 3.1)

Scientific classification
- Kingdom: Animalia
- Phylum: Mollusca
- Class: Gastropoda
- Order: Stylommatophora
- Family: Lauriidae
- Genus: Leiostyla
- Species: L. vincta

Binomial name
- Leiostyla vincta (R.T.Lowe, 1852)

Species of gastropod

Leiostyla vincta is a species of minuscule, air-breathing land snail, a terrestrial pulmonate gastropod mollusk in the family Lauriidae.

== Distribution ==
This species is endemic to Madeira, Portugal.
