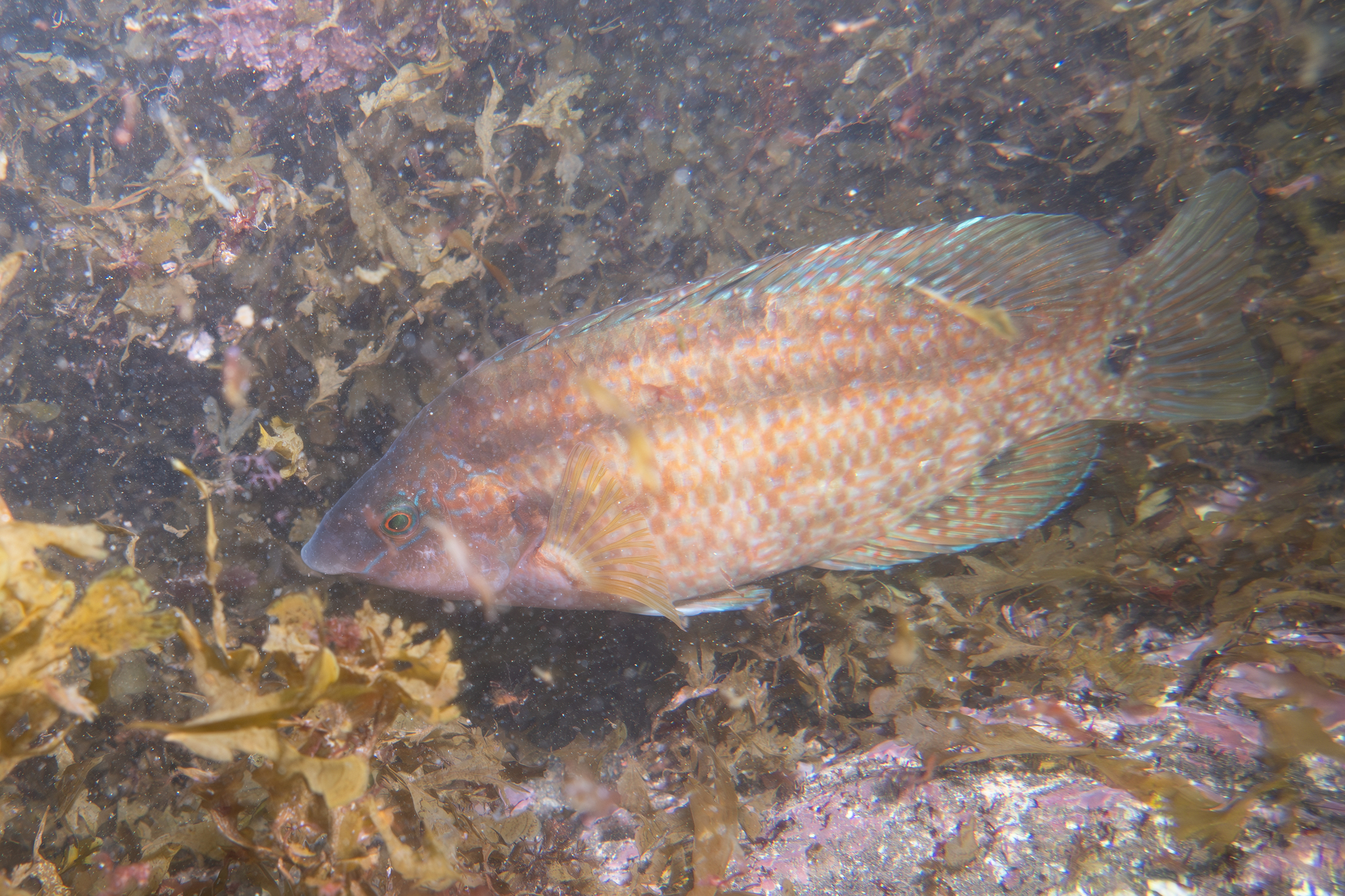

Conservation status
- Least Concern (IUCN 3.1)

Scientific classification
- Kingdom: Animalia
- Phylum: Chordata
- Class: Actinopterygii
- Order: Labriformes
- Family: Labridae
- Genus: Symphodus
- Species: S. caeruleus

Binomial name
- Symphodus caeruleus (Azevedo, 1999)

Synonyms
- Centrolabrus caeruleus Azevedo, 1999

= Symphodus caeruleus =

Species of fish

Symphodus caeruleus is a species of marine ray-finned fish, a wrasse from the family Labridae. It is endemic to the Azores in the eastern Atlantic Ocean.

== Description ==
Symphodus caeruleus is a larger species of wrasse than any of its sympatric congeners in the Azores and it has differing meristic counts. This species has 17-18 spines and 8-9 rays in its dorsal fin, 5-6 spines and 7-9 rays in its anal fin. It has 33-34 scales in its lateral line. The females are an overall brownish colour, fading ventrally, with a chequered pattern of dark brown spotting on the body. There are four elongated spots on the body, with a fifth on the caudal peduncle which extends onto the proximate portion of the caudal fin, these spots are mirrored in the dorsal and anal fins. The terminal phase males are dark greenish=blue, becoming bluer in the breeding season, with paler fins and a pattern of darker spots similar to that of the females. The males can reach a standard length of 21.5 centimetres (8.5 in) while females attain 17.5 centimetres (6.9 in).

== Distribution ==
Symphodus caeruleus is found in the eastern Atlantic where it is endemic to the Azores.

== Habitat and biology ==
Symphodus caeruleus is found over shallow, inshore rocky reefs with a good cover of algae which it uses for cover, feeding and nesting. Like many wrasse species this fish is a protogynous hermaphrodite, with sexual maturity being attained by males at a total length of 12 centimetres (4.7 in) and 14 centimetres (5.5 in) for females. This means that the males can still resemble the initial phase or be in their terminal phase after changing sex from a female. They spawn from March to June when the larger terminal males form harems and become territorial, this attracts females to spawn their demersal eggs in the male's nest and the males then provide exclusive care for the eggs. The males still resembling the initial phase, i.e. they look like females, possess larger testes than the terminal phase males and they may attempt to sneakily fertilise the eggs during spawning.

== Taxonomy ==
Symphodus caeruleus was first formally described as Centrolabrus caeruleus in 1999, previously all wrasses from the genus Centrolabrus in the Azores had been identified as the emerald wrasse (Centrolabrus trutta). Later studies showed that this species was not as closely related to the rock cook as thought and it was placed in the genus Symphodus. The specific name caeruleus refers to the blue colouration of the terminal phase males.
