= Consors =

Consors (Latin consors, "partner") can refer to:

- Cortal Consors, a European broker in personal investing and online trading
- Catocala consors, a moth of the Noctuidae family
- Caseolus consors, a land snail
- Laosaurus consors, a species of Othnielosaurus dinosaur
- Abrictosaurus consors, a species of Abrictosaurus dinosaur
- Crotalophorus consors, a synonym for the venomous pit viper species Sistrurus catenatus
- Consors imperii, an ancient Roman partner in an emperorship
- Valsaria consors, an alternate name for the plant canker Valsaria insitiva

See also

- Consor
