= Leiostyla monticola =

Conservation status
- Least Concern (IUCN 3.1)

Scientific classification
- Kingdom: Animalia
- Phylum: Mollusca
- Class: Gastropoda
- Order: Stylommatophora
- Family: Lauriidae
- Genus: Leiostyla
- Species: L. monticola

Binomial name
- Leiostyla monticola (Lowe, 1831)

Species of gastropod

Leiostyla monticola is a species of land snail in the family Lauriidae. It is endemic to Porto Santo Island in the Madeira archipelago.

This snail occurs at a few sites on the main mountain peaks of the island. It lives in leaf litter on rocky slopes and in abandoned conifer plantations. The population is likely stable, but potential threats include recreational activities on the mountains.
