= Leiostyla cassida =

Conservation status
- Critically Endangered (IUCN 3.1)

Scientific classification
- Kingdom: Animalia
- Phylum: Mollusca
- Class: Gastropoda
- Order: Stylommatophora
- Family: Lauriidae
- Genus: Leiostyla
- Species: L. cassida

Binomial name
- Leiostyla cassida (R.T.Lowe, 1831)

Species of gastropod

Leiostyla cassida is a species of small, air-breathing land snail, a terrestrial pulmonate gastropod mollusks in the family Lauriidae.

This species is endemic to Portugal. This species is mentioned in Annexes II and IV of the Habitats Directive.

This is one of several species sometimes referred as the Madeiran land snail.
