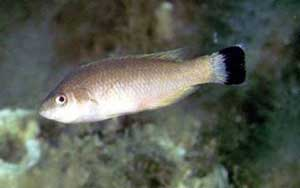

Conservation status
- Least Concern (IUCN 3.1)

Scientific classification
- Kingdom: Animalia
- Phylum: Chordata
- Class: Actinopterygii
- Order: Labriformes
- Family: Labridae
- Genus: Centrolabrus
- Species: C. melanocercus

Binomial name
- Centrolabrus melanocercus (Risso, 1810)

Synonyms
- Lutjanus melanocercus Risso, 1810; Crenilabrus melanocercus (Risso, 1810); Symphodus melanocercus (Risso, 1810)

= Centrolabrus melanocercus =

Species of fish

Centrolabrus melanocercus, the black-tailed wrasse, is a species of marine ray-finned fish from the wrasse family Labridae which is found in the Mediterranean Sea and the Sea of Marmara.

== Taxonomy ==
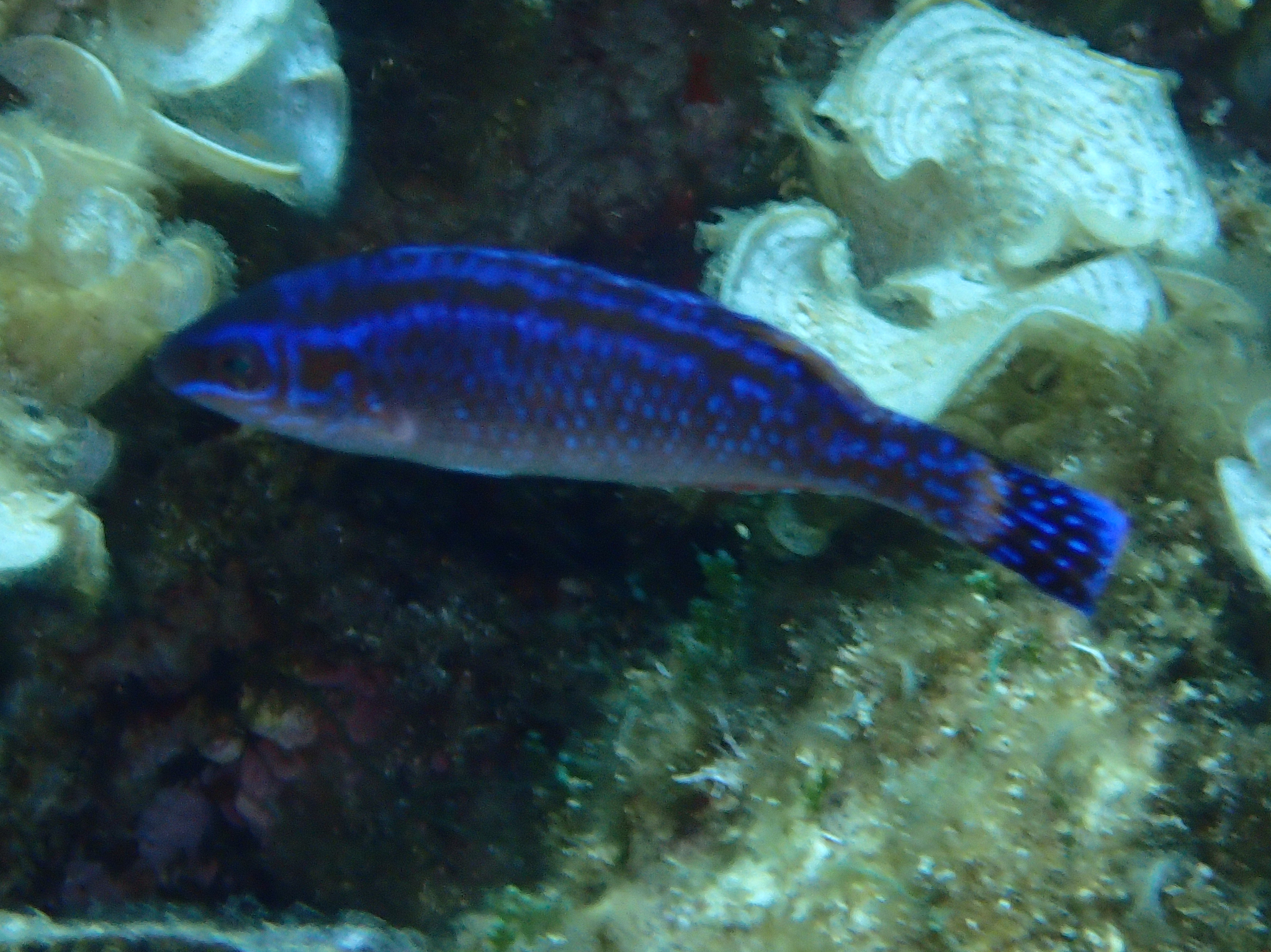
Terminal phase

This species was formally described in 1810 as Lutjanus melanocercus by Antoine Risso with the type locality given as Saint Hospice near Villefranche-sur-Mer on the Mediterranean coast of France. This species was regarded as a member of the genus Symphodus but meristic and behavioural data placed it closer to the rock cook than the sexually dimorphic paternal nesting fishes in Symphodus.

== Biology ==
This species prefers areas with rocks or eelgrass at depths from 1 to 25 m (3.3 to 82.0 ft). It can reach 14 cm (5.5 in) in total length, though most do not exceed 11 cm (4.3 in).
