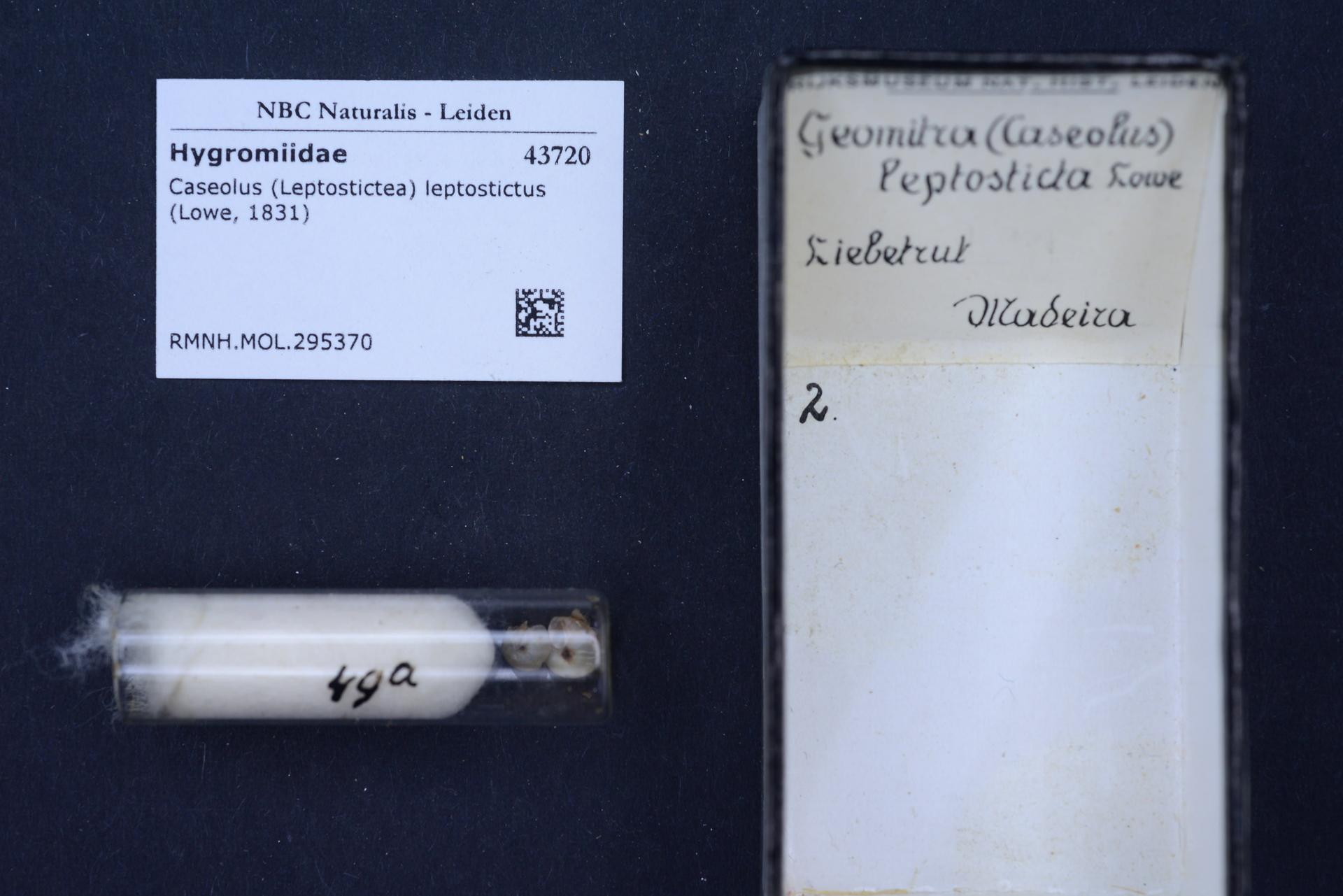

Conservation status
- Vulnerable (IUCN 3.1)

Scientific classification
- Kingdom: Animalia
- Phylum: Mollusca
- Class: Gastropoda
- Order: Stylommatophora
- Family: Geomitridae
- Genus: Caseolus
- Species: C. leptostictus

Binomial name
- Caseolus leptostictus (R.T. Lowe, 1852)

Synonyms
- Helix leptosticta R.T. Lowe, 1831

= Caseolus leptostictus =

Species of gastropod

Caseolus leptostictus is a species of small air-breathing land snails, terrestrial pulmonate gastropod mollusks in the family Geomitridae. This species is endemic to the Madeira island, Portugal.
