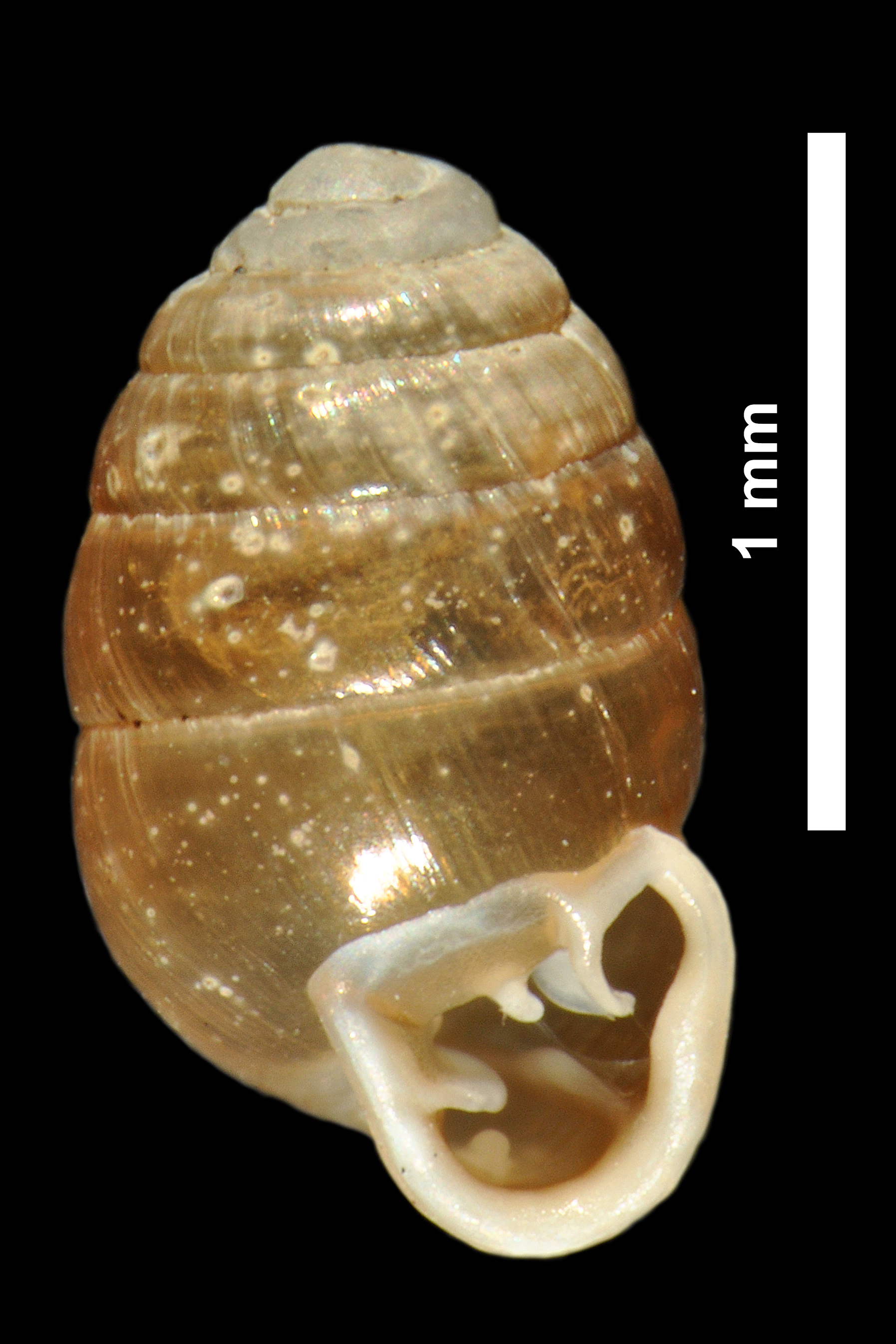
- shell of Leiostyla anglica (specimen at MNHN, Paris)

Scientific classification
- Kingdom: Animalia
- Phylum: Mollusca
- Class: Gastropoda
- Order: Stylommatophora
- Family: Lauriidae
- Genus: Leiostyla
- Species: L. anglica

Binomial name
- Leiostyla anglica (Férussac, 1821)

= Leiostyla anglica =

Species of gastropod

Leiostyla anglica is a species of small air-breathing land snail, a terrestrial pulmonate gastropod mollusk in the family Lauriidae.

== Description ==
For terms see gastropod shell

The 3.1-3.7 x 1.7-2.1 mm shell is oval with 5 to 6.5 very slightly convex whorls. The apertural margin is U-shaped with a pronounced circular angular sinus and a strong angularis. The parietalis is also strong but deeper inside. There is strong columellaris and two weaker and deeper palatal folds. The shell is reddish-brown. It is almost smooth or weakly striated. The animal is light, almost transparent, except for the greyish head and tentacles. The upper tentacles are long, and the lower tentacles are very short, like tubercles.

== Distribution ==
This species is known to occur in a number of European countries and islands, including the UK, Ireland, Portugal, and France.
