= Leiostyla corneocostata =

Conservation status
- Vulnerable (IUCN 3.1)

Scientific classification
- Kingdom: Animalia
- Phylum: Mollusca
- Class: Gastropoda
- Order: Stylommatophora
- Family: Lauriidae
- Genus: Leiostyla
- Species: L. corneocostata

Binomial name
- Leiostyla corneocostata Wollaston, 1878

Species of gastropod

Leiostyla corneocostata is a species of land snail in the family Lauriidae known commonly as the Madeiran land snail. It is endemic to Porto Santo Island in the Madeira archipelago.

This species is limited to a range of about 6 square kilometers on a single island. It lives in coastal habitat in the sea spray zone where it lives in rock cracks and under vegetation. The population is likely stable, but the species is threatened by development of the beach areas near its habitat.
