= Leiostyla falknerorum =

Conservation status
- Endangered (IUCN 3.1)

Scientific classification
- Kingdom: Animalia
- Phylum: Mollusca
- Class: Gastropoda
- Order: Stylommatophora
- Family: Lauriidae
- Genus: Leiostyla
- Species: L. falknerorum

Binomial name
- Leiostyla falknerorum Bank, Groh & Ripken, 2002

Synonyms
- Pupa laevigata Lowe, 1852 non von Gallenstein, 1848

Species of gastropod

Leiostyla falknerorum is a species of small air-breathing land snail, a terrestrial pulmonate gastropod mollusk in the family Lauriidae.

== Distribution ==
This species is endemic to Madeira, Portugal.
