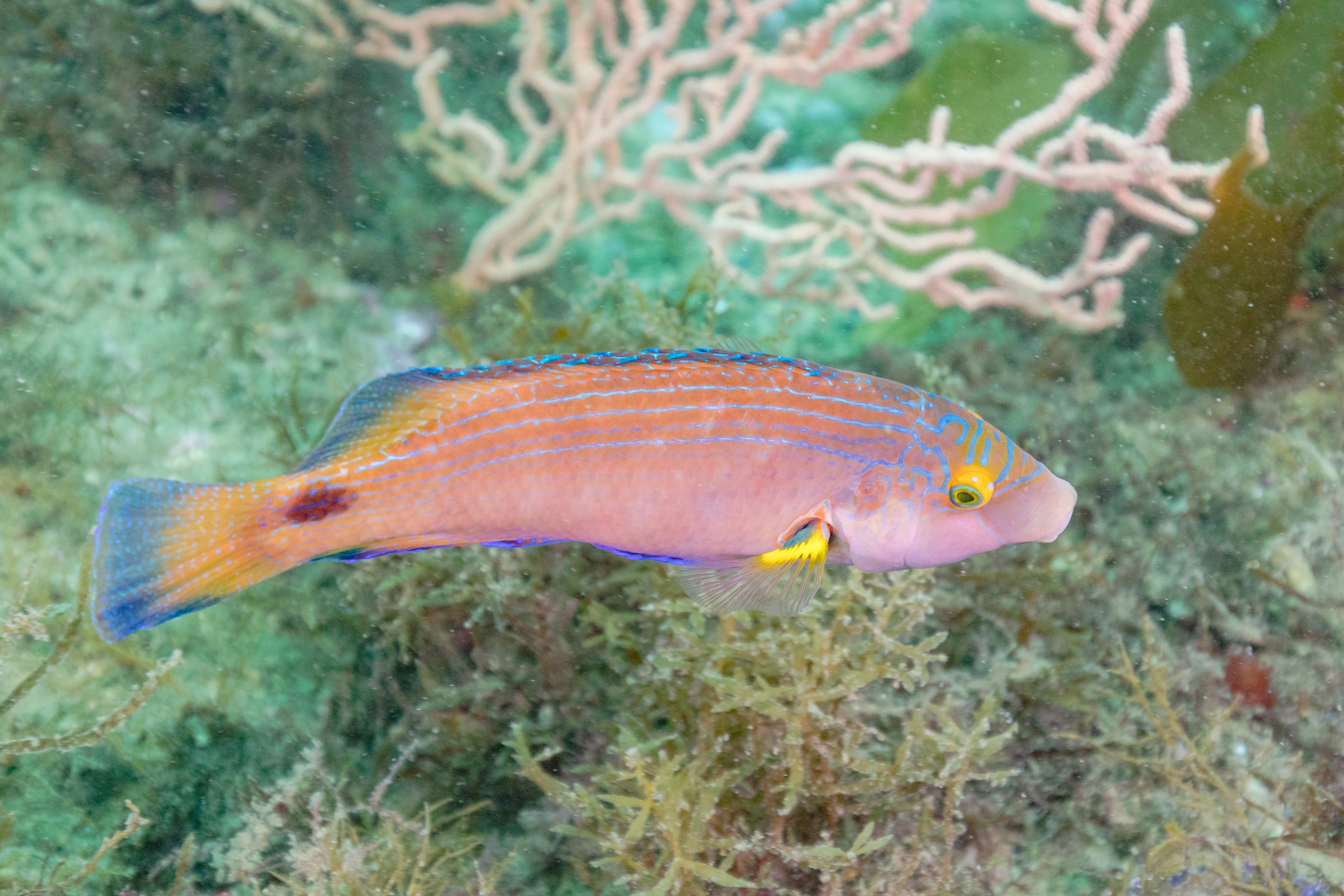

Conservation status
- Least Concern (IUCN 3.1)

Scientific classification
- Kingdom: Animalia
- Phylum: Chordata
- Class: Actinopterygii
- Division: Teleostei
- Order: Labriformes
- Family: Labridae
- Genus: Symphodus
- Species: S. mediterraneus

Binomial name
- Symphodus mediterraneus (Linnaeus, 1758)

Synonyms
- List: Perca mediterranea Linnaeus, 1758; Crenilabrus mediterraneus (Linnaeus, 1758); Lutjanus mediterraneus (Linnaeus, 1758); Labrus serpentinus Bonnaterre, 1788; Labrus coeruleovittatus Bonnaterre, 1788; Labrus unimaculatus J. F. Gmelin, 1789; Lutjanus massiliensis Lacépède, 1802; Lutjanus brunnichii Lacepède, 1802; Crenilabrus brunnichii (Lacepède, 1802); Labrus pittima Rafinesque, 1810; Crenilabrus boryanus A. Risso, 1827; Crenilabrus nigrescens A. Risso, 1827; Crenilabrus pictus R. T. Lowe, 1838

= Axillary wrasse =

Species of fish

The axillary wrasse (Symphodus mediterraneus) is a species of wrasse native to the eastern Atlantic Ocean from the Azores and Madeira to the coasts of Portugal to Morocco and then along the coastal waters of the Mediterranean Sea. This species can be found in eelgrass beds at depths from 1 to 50 m (3.3 to 164.0 ft). It can reach 18 cm (7.1 in) in standard length, though most do not exceed 12 cm (4.7 in). This species is important to local peoples as a food fish and is also sought as a game fish. It can also be found in the aquarium trade.

Adults are found mainly in eel-grass beds. Often in pairs. Males nest-makers. Feed mainly on mollusks, gastropods, bivalves, tubicolous worms, chitons, sea urchins and bryozoans. Oviparous, distinct pairing during breeding.
