= Caseolus calculus =

Conservation status
- Vulnerable (IUCN 3.1)

Scientific classification
- Kingdom: Animalia
- Phylum: Mollusca
- Class: Gastropoda
- Order: Stylommatophora
- Family: Geomitridae
- Genus: Caseolus
- Species: C. calculus

Binomial name
- Caseolus calculus Lowe, 1854

Species of gastropod

Caseolus calculus (common name: Madeiran land snail) is a species of small air-breathing land snails, terrestrial pulmonate gastropod molluscs in the family Geomitridae, the hairy snails and their allies.

== Distribution and conservation status ==
This species lives in Europe. It is mentioned in annexes II and IV of Habitats Directive.
