= Leiostyla vermiculosa =

Conservation status
- Data Deficient (IUCN 3.1)

Scientific classification
- Kingdom: Animalia
- Phylum: Mollusca
- Class: Gastropoda
- Order: Stylommatophora
- Family: Lauriidae
- Genus: Leiostyla
- Species: L. vermiculosa

Binomial name
- Leiostyla vermiculosa Morelet, 1860

Species of gastropod

Leiostyla vermiculosa is a species of small, air-breathing land snail, a terrestrial pulmonate gastropod mollusk in the family Lauriidae.

== Distribution ==
This species is endemic to Portugal.
