= Leiostyla filicum =

Conservation status
- Vulnerable (IUCN 3.1)

Scientific classification
- Kingdom: Animalia
- Phylum: Mollusca
- Class: Gastropoda
- Order: Stylommatophora
- Family: Lauriidae
- Genus: Leiostyla
- Species: L. filicum

Binomial name
- Leiostyla filicum Holyoak & Seddon, 1986

Species of gastropod

Leiostyla filicum is a species of land snail in the family Lauriidae. It is endemic to Madeira Island in the Madeira archipelago.

This snail is limited to two river valleys on the island, where it occurs in laurisilva habitat. It lives in leaf litter in moist spots, sometimes next to waterfalls. Its habitat lies within Parque Natural da Madeira, a protected area.
