= Leiostyla relevata =

Conservation status
- Near Threatened (IUCN 3.1)

Scientific classification
- Kingdom: Animalia
- Phylum: Mollusca
- Class: Gastropoda
- Order: Stylommatophora
- Family: Lauriidae
- Genus: Leiostyla
- Species: L. relevata

Binomial name
- Leiostyla relevata (Wollaston, 1878)

Species of gastropod

Leiostyla relevata is a species of small air-breathing land snail in the family Lauriidae. It is endemic to Ilhéu de Baixo, an islet near Porto Santo Island in the Madeira archipelago.

This snail is only known from a single site on the wet seaside cliffs of the islet. The population, though small, is likely stable because the island is isolated from most threats.
