= Caseolus commixtus =

Conservation status
- Least Concern (IUCN 3.1)

Scientific classification
- Kingdom: Animalia
- Phylum: Mollusca
- Class: Gastropoda
- Order: Stylommatophora
- Family: Geomitridae
- Genus: Caseolus
- Species: C. commixtus

Binomial name
- Caseolus commixtus R. T. Lowe, 1852

Species of gastropod

Caseolus commixtus is a species of small air-breathing land snails, terrestrial pulmonate gastropod mollusks in the family Geomitridae.

Although the Fauna Europaea spells this species name as shown here, with a -us ending, in many other sources, including the International Wildlife Law listing the name is spelled "Caseolus commixta". It is assumed these usages are in error, firstly because the Latin word "caseolus" is masculine, and also for reasons of consistency, because Richard Thomas Lowe has named at least five other species in the genus Caseolus using masculine adjectival names.

== Distribution ==
This species of land snail occurs in Porto Santo Island, Madeira, Portugal. It is mentioned in Annexes II and IV of Habitats Directive.
