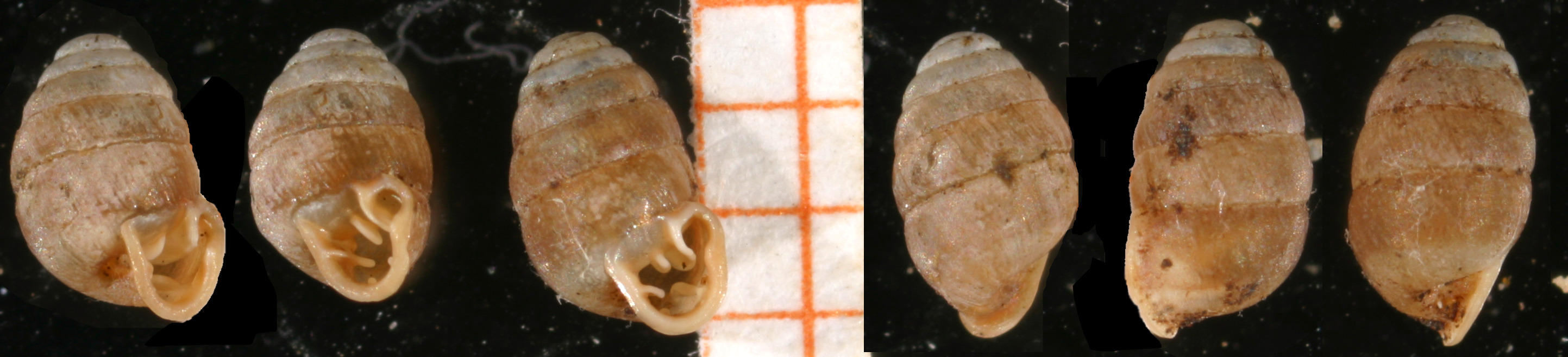
- Two views of three shells of Leiostyla anglica

Scientific classification
- Domain: Eukaryota
- Kingdom: Animalia
- Phylum: Mollusca
- Class: Gastropoda
- Order: Stylommatophora
- Infraorder: Pupilloidei
- Superfamily: Pupilloidea
- Family: Lauriidae
- Genus: Leiostyla; R. T. Lowe, 1852

Type species
- Pupa (Leiostyla) vincta R. T. Lowe, 1852

Synonyms
- Alvearella R. T. Lowe, 1852; Caucasica Caziot & Margier, 1909 (invalid; not O. Boettger, 1877); Caucasipupa Pilsbry, 1926; Charadrobia Albers, 1854; Eryma Albers, 1854; Euxinolauria Lindholm, 1924 (junior synonym); Lauria (Euxinolauria) Lindholm, 1924 (original rank); Lauria (Leiostyla) R. T. Lowe, 1852; Leiostyla (Azoripupa) Pilsbry, 1923· accepted, alternate representation; Leiostyla (Craticula) R. T. Lowe, 1852· accepted, alternate representation; Leiostyla (Euxinolauria) Lindholm, 1924 (junior synonym); Leiostyla (Leiostyla) R. T. Lowe, 1852· accepted, alternate representation; Leiostyla (Mastula) R. T. Lowe, 1852· accepted, alternate representation; Leiostyla (Matschachelia) Schileyko, 1975· accepted, alternate representation; Leiostyla (Neolauria) Schileyko, 1975· accepted, alternate representation; Leiostyla (Scarabella) R. T. Lowe, 1855· accepted, alternate representation; Leiostyla (Wollastonula) Pilsbry, 1922· accepted, alternate representation; Liostyla E. von Martens, 1860; Pupa (Leiostyla) R. T. Lowe, 1852 (original rank); Pupa (Scarabella) R. T. Lowe, 1855 (basionym); Vertigo (Scarabella) R. T. Lowe, 1855

= Leiostyla =

Genus of gastropods

Leiostyla is a genus of small air-breathing land snails, terrestrial pulmonate gastropod mollusks in the family Lauriidae.

The genus Leiostyla was previously placed in the subfamily Lauriinae, within the family Pupillidae.

== Species ==
Species in the genus Leiostyla include:

- Leiostyla abbreviata (R. T. Lowe, 1852) - also known as Madeiran land snail
- Leiostyla albina (Pilsbry, 1931)
- Leiostyla anglica (A. Férussac, 1821)
- Leiostyla arborea (R. T. Lowe, 1855)
- † Leiostyla austriaca (Wenz, 1921)
- Leiostyla beatae Walther & Hausdorf, 2015
- Leiostyla calathiscus (R. T. Lowe, 1831)
- † Leiostyla capellinii (Sacco, 1886)
- Leiostyla cassida (R. T. Lowe, 1831)- also known as Madeiran land snail
- Leiostyla cassidula (R. T. Lowe, 1852)
- Leiostyla castanea (Shuttleworth, 1852)
- † Leiostyla castanheiraensis Groh & Pokryszko, 2019
- Leiostyla caucasica (L. Pfeiffer, 1855)
- Leiostyla cheiligona (R. T. Lowe, 1831)
- Leiostyla colvillei Seddon & Killeen, 1996
- Leiostyla concinna (R. T. Lowe, 1852)
- † Leiostyla cooki Cameron & Pokryszko, 2019
- Leiostyla corneocostata (Wollaston, 1878) - also known as Madeiran land snail
- Leiostyla crassilabris Hausdorf, 1990
- Leiostyla degenerata (Wollaston, 1878)
- † Leiostyla desertaensis Groh, Cameron & Teixeira, 2019
- Leiostyla eikenboomi Bank, Menkhorst & Neubert, 2016
- † Leiostyla espigaoensis Seddon, 1990
- Leiostyla falknerorum Bank, Groh & Ripken, 2002
- Leiostyla ferraria (R. T. Lowe, 1852)
- Leiostyla filicum D. T. Holyoak & Seddon, 1986
- Leiostyla fusca (R. T. Lowe, 1852)
- Leiostyla fuscidula (Morelet, 1860)
- Leiostyla gibba (R. T. Lowe, 1852) - Madeiran land snail
- Leiostyla glomerosa (Suvorov & Schileyko, 1991)
- † Leiostyla gottschicki (Wenz, 1922)
- Leiostyla heterodon (Pilsbry, 1923)
- Leiostyla honesta (Suvorov & Schileyko, 1991)
- Leiostyla iranica E. Gittenberger & Pieper, 1988
- Leiostyla irrigua (R. T. Lowe, 1852)
- † Leiostyla krstichae Prysjazhnjuk, 2015
- Leiostyla lamellosa (R. T. Lowe, 1852)
- Leiostyla laurinea (R. T. Lowe, 1852)
- Leiostyla loweana (Wollaston, 1878)
- Leiostyla macilenta (R. T. Lowe, 1852)
- Leiostyla mica (Schileyko, 1998)
- Leiostyla millegrana (R. T. Lowe, 1852)
- Leiostyla monticola (R. T. Lowe, 1831)
- Leiostyla nemethi Hausdorf, 1996
- Leiostyla numidica (Bourguignat, 1864)
- Leiostyla paphlagonica Hausdorf, 1990
- Leiostyla paulinae (Lindholm, 1913)
- † Leiostyla piserai Harzhauser & Neubauer, 2018
- Leiostyla pontica (Retowski, 1889)
- † Leiostyla priscilla (Paladilhe, 1873)
- Leiostyla pulchra (Retowski, 1883)
- Leiostyla recta (R. T. Lowe, 1852)
- Leiostyla rectidentata (Schileyko, 1976)
- Leiostyla relevata (Wollaston, 1878)
- Leiostyla rugulosa (Morelet, 1860)
- Leiostyla schweigeri (Götting, 1963)
- Leiostyla silicea (Schileyko, 1975)
- † Leiostyla simulans Cameron & Groh, 2019
- Leiostyla simulator (Pilsbry, 1923)
- Leiostyla sinangula (Schileyko, 1975)
- Leiostyla sphinctostoma (R. T. Lowe, 1831)
- † Leiostyla subcorneocostata Seddon, 1990
- Leiostyla superba Hausdorf, 1990
- Leiostyla superstructa (Mousson, 1876)
- Leiostyla taeniata (Shuttleworth, 1852)
- Leiostyla tenuimarginata (Pilsbry, 1922)
- Leiostyla tesselata (Morelet, 1860)
- Leiostyla vermiculosa (Morelet, 1860)
- Leiostyla vincta (R. T. Lowe, 1852)
- Leiostyla vitrea (Schileyko, 1988)
- † Leiostyla wollastoni (Paiva, 1866)
- Leiostyla zonifera (Pilsbry, 1934)

Species brought into synonymy

- Leiostyla adolfi Pokryszko, 1991: synonym of Leiostyla paulinae (Lindholm, 1913) (junior synonym)
