= Leiostyla degenerata =

Conservation status
- Near Threatened (IUCN 3.1)

Scientific classification
- Kingdom: Animalia
- Phylum: Mollusca
- Class: Gastropoda
- Order: Stylommatophora
- Family: Lauriidae
- Genus: Leiostyla
- Species: L. degenerata

Binomial name
- Leiostyla degenerata Wollaston, 1886

Species of gastropod

Leiostyla degenerata is a species of land snail in the family Lauriidae. It is endemic to Porto Santo Island in the Madeira archipelago.

This snail is found only on the slopes of Pico Branco, a mountain on the island. Its entire known range measures about 3 by 2 kilometers. It lives with other Leiostyla species in leaf litter and rock cracks. The population, though small, is likely stable and there are no immediate threats.
