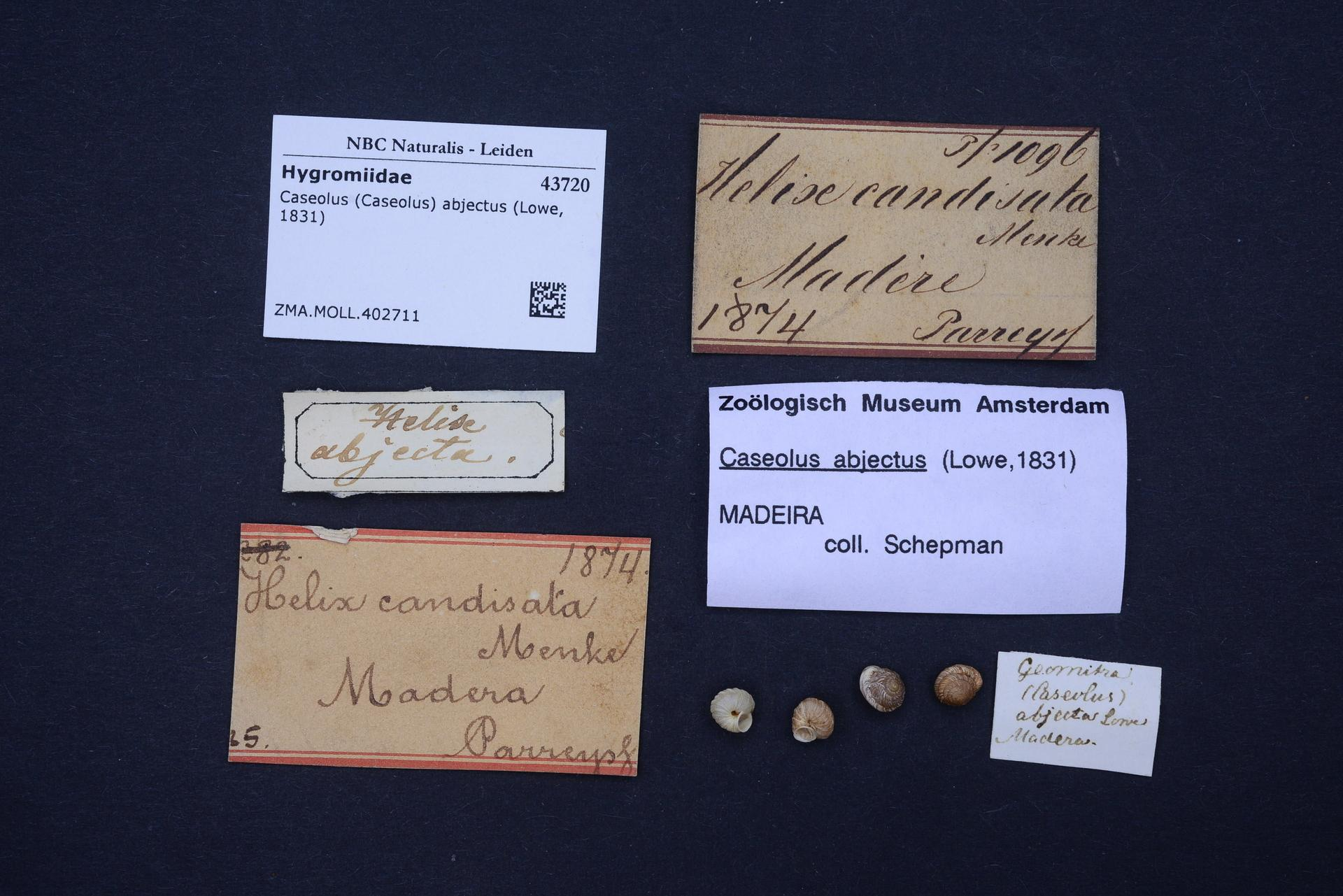

Conservation status
- Least Concern (IUCN 3.1)

Scientific classification
- Kingdom: Animalia
- Phylum: Mollusca
- Class: Gastropoda
- Order: Stylommatophora
- Family: Geomitridae
- Genus: Caseolus
- Species: C. abjectus

Binomial name
- Caseolus abjectus (R.T. Lowe, 1831)

= Caseolus abjectus =

Species of gastropod

Caseolus abjectus is a species of land snail in the family Geomitridae, the hairy snails and their allies. It is endemic to Madeira, where it occurs on three islands in the archipelago.

The subspecies C. abjectus abjectus occurs on Porto Santo Island. It has a limited range but it is an abundant snail where it does occur. The subspecies C. abjectus nesiotes occurs mostly on Bugio and has been found at one site on Deserta Grande. There its habitat has been degraded by the overgrazing of introduced goats. The goat population has been reduced as a conservation measure for the habitat on the islands, improving the outlook for the snail subspecies.
