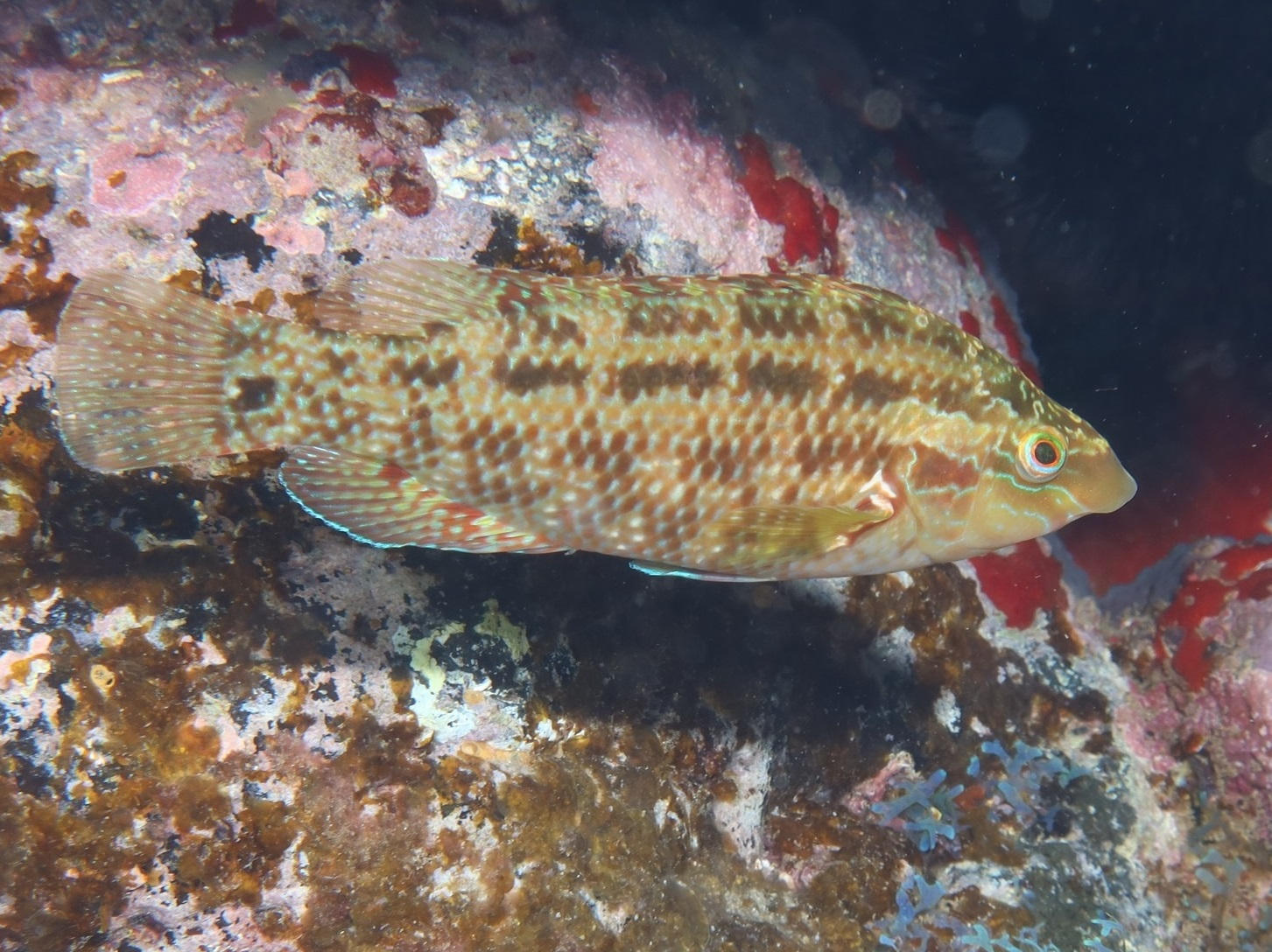

Conservation status
- Least Concern (IUCN 3.1)

Scientific classification
- Kingdom: Animalia
- Phylum: Chordata
- Class: Actinopterygii
- Order: Labriformes
- Family: Labridae
- Genus: Symphodus
- Species: S. trutta

Binomial name
- Symphodus trutta (Lowe), 1834

Synonyms
- Crenilabrus trutta Lowe, 1834; Centrolabrus trutta (Lowe, 1834); Acantholabrus viridis Valenciennes, 1839; Acantholabrus romeritus Valenciennes, 1843; Centrolabrus romeritus (Valenciennes, 1843); Acantholabrus romerus Valenciennes, 1843

= Emerald wrasse =

Species of fish

The emerald wrasse (Symphodus trutta) is a species of marine ray-finned fish, a wrasse from the family Labridae. It is endemic to the eastern Atlantic Ocean where it is found in the Macaronesian archipelagoes of the Canary Islands and Madeira, including the Savage Islands. This species was formerly thought to be found in the Azores but the specimens there were found to belong to a separate species Symphodus caeruleus.
