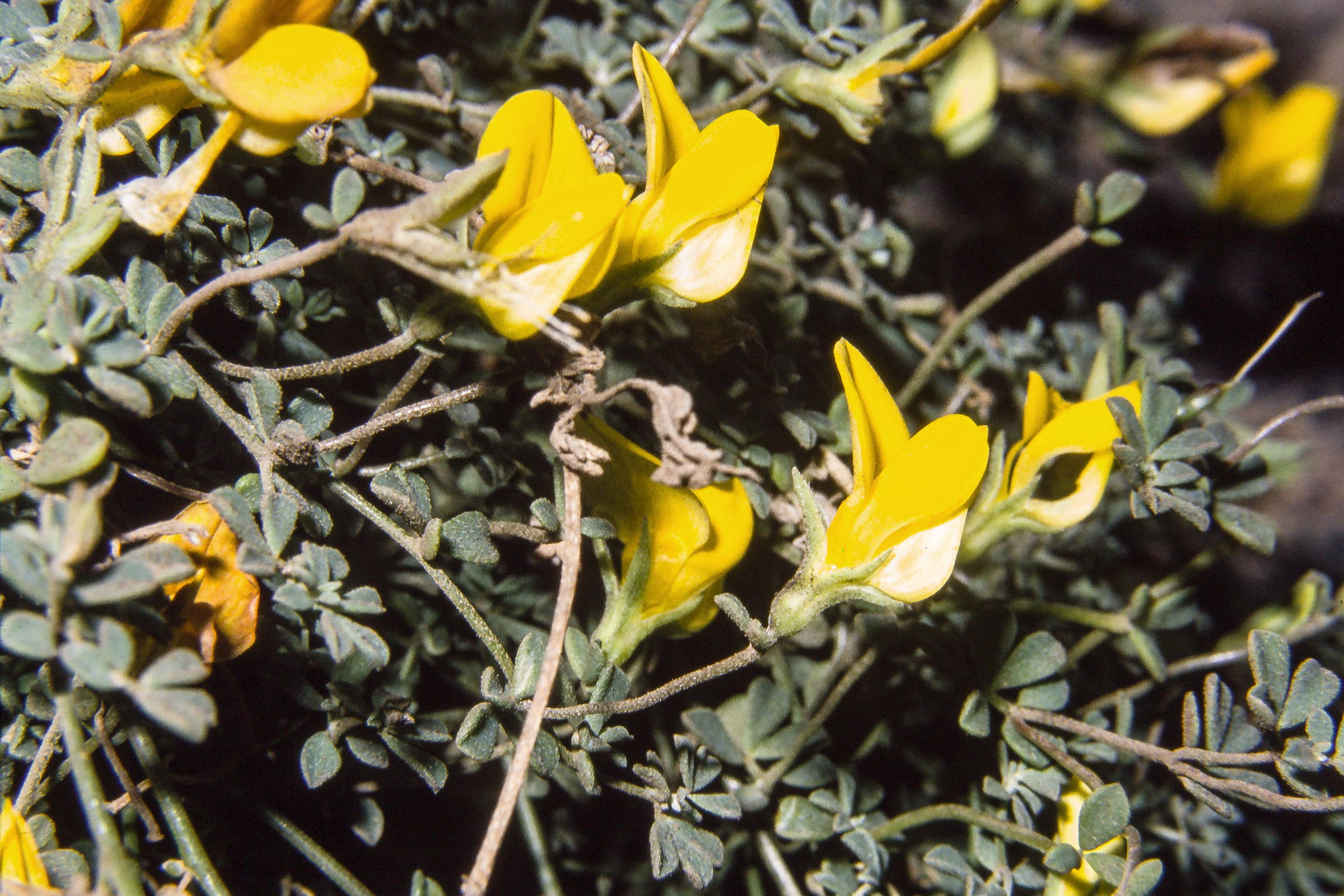
- In habitat in a dry rocky area at Punta de Teno, Tenerife

Scientific classification
- Kingdom: Plantae
- Clade: Tracheophytes
- Clade: Angiosperms
- Clade: Eudicots
- Clade: Rosids
- Order: Fabales
- Family: Fabaceae
- Subfamily: Faboideae
- Genus: Lotus
- Species: L. tenellus

Binomial name
- Lotus tenellus (Lowe) Sandral, A.Santos & D.D.Sokoloff

Synonyms
- Pedrosia tenella Lowe; Pedrosia leptophylla R. Lowe; Lotus leptophyllus (R. Lowe) K. Larsen; Lotus glaucus var. angustifolius R.P. Murray; Lotus glaucus subsp. sessilifolius (DC.) Bornm.; Lotus glaucus auct. non Ait.

= Lotus tenellus =

Species of legume

Lotus tenellus is a species of flowering plant in the family Fabaceae, native to the Canary Islands. Some authors have included L. tenellus in Lotus glaucus, a species found in Madeira and the Salvage Islands. L. leptophyllus may be treated as a synonym of L. tenellus or as a separate species. L. tenellus has yellow flowers, with usually no more than three flowers in each flower head (umbel). Its leaves are made up of five leaflets.

== Description ==
Lotus tenellus is a perennial herbaceous or shrubby plant. The leaves are either unstalked (sessile) or have a very short petiole, and are made up of five pinnate leaflets. The two basal leaflets are 1–5 mm long. A short axis (rhachis) 1–2 mm long, shorter than the basal leaflets, separates them from the other three leaflets, which are 2–7 mm long, usually longer than the basal leaflets. The stems and leaves have either straight hairs which lie flat along the surface or curved upright hairs – sometimes a mixture of the two. The hairs are not particularly dense, so that the surface is clearly visible. The yellow flowers are arranged in umbels, usually with one to three flowers, occasionally up to four. The peduncule (stem) of the umbel is two to six times as long as the subtending leaves. The upper petal (the standard) is nearly as long as the keel petals, being 9–14 mm long. The wing petals are usually just shorter than the keel at 8–13 mm. The fruit pods are straight.

== Taxonomy ==
Lotus tenellus was first described, as Pedrosia tenella, by Richard Thomas Lowe in 1862. Lowe created a new genus, Pedrosia, for some species of Lotus. (The genus is now usually treated as Lotus section Pedrosia.) Lowe distinguished Pedrosia tenella (Lotus tenellus), found in the Canary Islands, from Pedrosia glauca (Lotus glaucus), found in Madeira. Subsequent authors did not accept either his genus or this distinction, sinking Lotus tenellus into Lotus glaucus. A survey of Lotus sect. Pedrosia in 2006 accepted Lowe's separation of the two species, transferring his Pedrosia tenella to Lotus.

Lowe distinguished Pedrosia tenella (Lotus tenellus) from Pedrosia leptophylla (Lotus leptophyllus). Some sources accept Lotus leptophyllus as a distinct species. A 2006 survey of Lotus section Pedrosia treats L. leptophyllus as a synonym of L. tenellus.

== Distribution and habitat ==
Lotus tenellus is found in the coastal zone of Tenerife and Gran Canaria.
