= Leiostyla heterodon =

Conservation status
- Vulnerable (IUCN 3.1)

Scientific classification
- Kingdom: Animalia
- Phylum: Mollusca
- Class: Gastropoda
- Order: Stylommatophora
- Family: Lauriidae
- Genus: Leiostyla
- Species: L. heterodon

Binomial name
- Leiostyla heterodon (Pilsbry, 1923)

Species of gastropod

Leiostyla heterodon is a species of small air-breathing land snail, a terrestrial pulmonate gastropod mollusk in the family Lauriidae.

== Distribution ==
This species is endemic to Madeira, Portugal, where it inhabits four closely localised sites in the central highlands of the island. It is found on rock ledges and on crags in the summit regions of Pico do Arieiro and Pico Ruivo.
