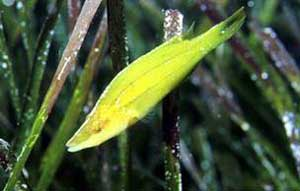
- S. rostratus

Scientific classification
- Kingdom: Animalia
- Phylum: Chordata
- Class: Actinopterygii
- Order: Labriformes
- Family: Labridae
- Subfamily: Labrinae
- Genus: Symphodus; Rafinesque, 1810

Type species
- Symphodus fulvescens Rafinesque, 1810

Synonyms
- Corycus Cuvier, 1814; Crenilabrus Oken, 1817

= Symphodus =

Symphodus Temporal range: Middle Miocene to present

Genus of fishes

Symphodus is a genus of wrasses native to the eastern Atlantic Ocean and the Mediterranean Sea.

== Species ==
The currently recognized extant species in this genus are:

Species	Common name	Image
Symphodus bailloni (Valenciennes, 1839)	Baillon's wrasse	
Symphodus caeruleus (Azevedo, 1999)		
Symphodus cinereus (Bonnaterre, 1788)	grey wrasse	
Symphodus doderleini D. S. Jordan, 1890		
Symphodus mediterraneus (Linnaeus, 1758)	axillary wrasse	
Symphodus melops (Linnaeus, 1758)	corkwing wrasse	
Symphodus ocellatus (Linnaeus, 1758)	ocellated wrasse	
Symphodus roissali (A. Risso, 1810)	five-spotted wrasse	
Symphodus rostratus (Bloch, 1791)	pointed-snout wrasse	
Symphodus tinca (Linnaeus, 1758)	East Atlantic peacock wrasse	
Symphodus trutta (Lowe 1834)	Emerald wrasse	

=== Fossil species ===
The following fossil species are known:

- †Symphodus salvus Bannikov, 1986 - Middle Miocene (Langhian) of Moldova
- †Symphodus woodwardi (Kramberger, 1891) - Middle Miocene (Langhian) of Croatia
- †Symphyodus westneati Carnevale, 2015 - Middle Miocene (Serravallian) of Austria
