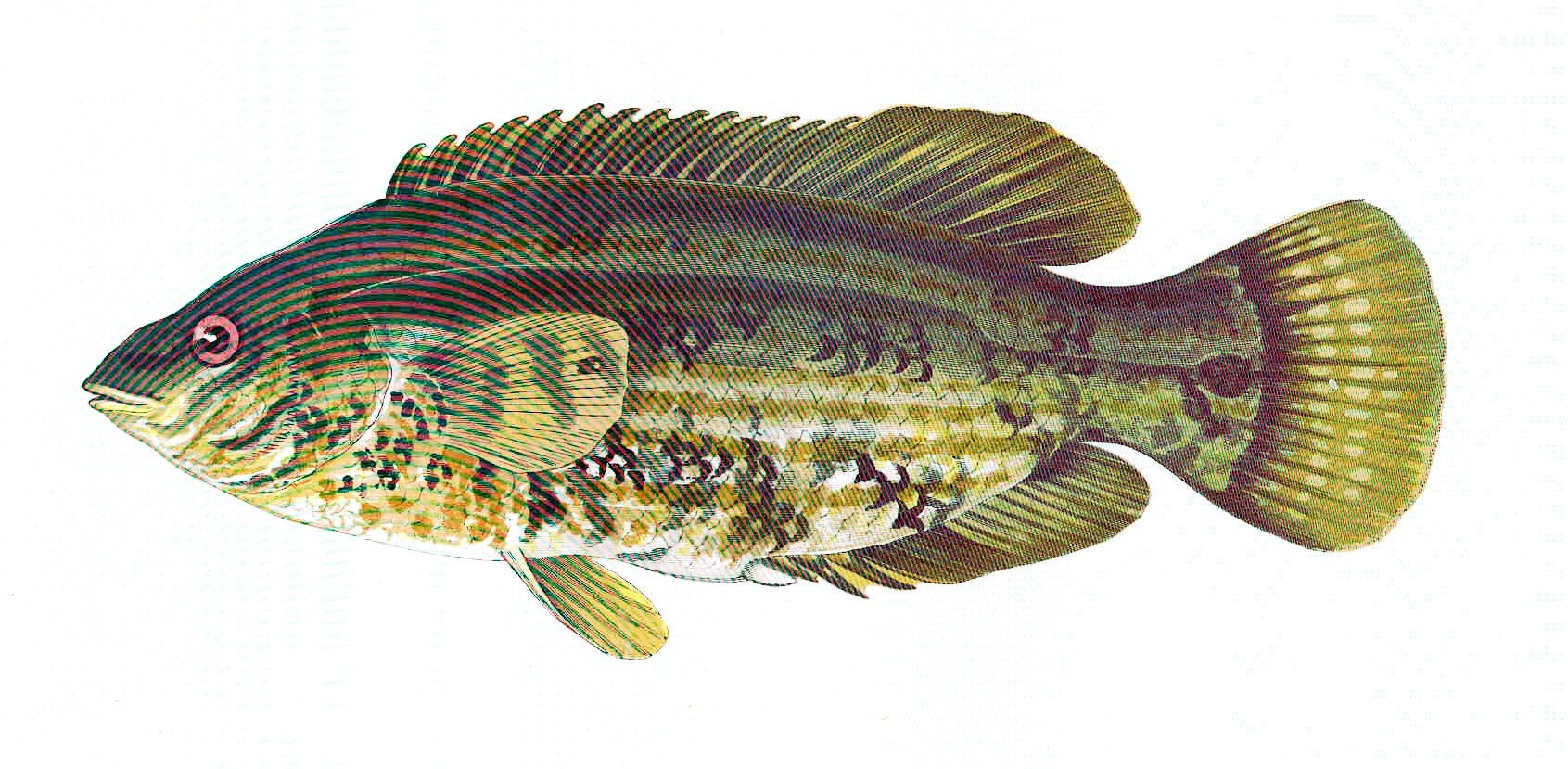

Conservation status
- Least Concern (IUCN 3.1)

Scientific classification
- Kingdom: Animalia
- Phylum: Chordata
- Class: Actinopterygii
- Order: Labriformes
- Family: Labridae
- Genus: Symphodus
- Species: S. bailloni

Binomial name
- Symphodus bailloni (Valenciennes, 1839)

Synonyms
- Crenilabrus bailloni Valenciennes, 1839; Crenilabrus donovani Valenciennes, 1839

= Baillon's wrasse =

Species of fish

Baillon's wrasse (Symphodus bailloni) is a species of wrasse native to the eastern Atlantic Ocean from the British Isles and Belgium to Mauritania and the western Mediterranean Sea along the coast of Spain and around the Balearic Islands. This species inhabits areas with plentiful weed growth or around rocks at depths from 1 to 50 m (3.3 to 164.0 ft). It can reach 23 cm (9.1 in) in standard length, though usually not exceeding 18 cm (7.1 in). The British Record (rod caught) for the heaviest fish is 285 grams caught in Poole Bay, Dorset on 3 September 2018 by David Lynes It is caught for human consumption in artisanal fisheries.
