= Caseolus subcalliferus =

Conservation status
- Critically Endangered (IUCN 3.1)

Scientific classification
- Kingdom: Animalia
- Phylum: Mollusca
- Class: Gastropoda
- Order: Stylommatophora
- Family: Geomitridae
- Genus: Caseolus
- Species: C. subcalliferus

Binomial name
- Caseolus subcalliferus (Reeve, 1854)

Synonyms
- Caseolus (Caseolus) subcalliferus (Reeve, 1854) · alternate representation; Caseolus (Caseolus) subcalliferus subcalliferus (Reeve, 1854) (superseded combination)

Species of gastropod

Caseolus subcalliferus is a species of air-breathing land snail, a terrestrial pulmonate gastropod mollusk in the family Geometridae, the hairy snails and their allies.

This species is endemic to Porto Santo, Portugal.

== Habitat ==
It lives on upper parts of various plants including Juncus maritimus.

== Conservation ==
The survival of this species is threatened by habitat loss, mainly from land-use management or fire, but also habitat degradation due to introduction of invasive plants.
