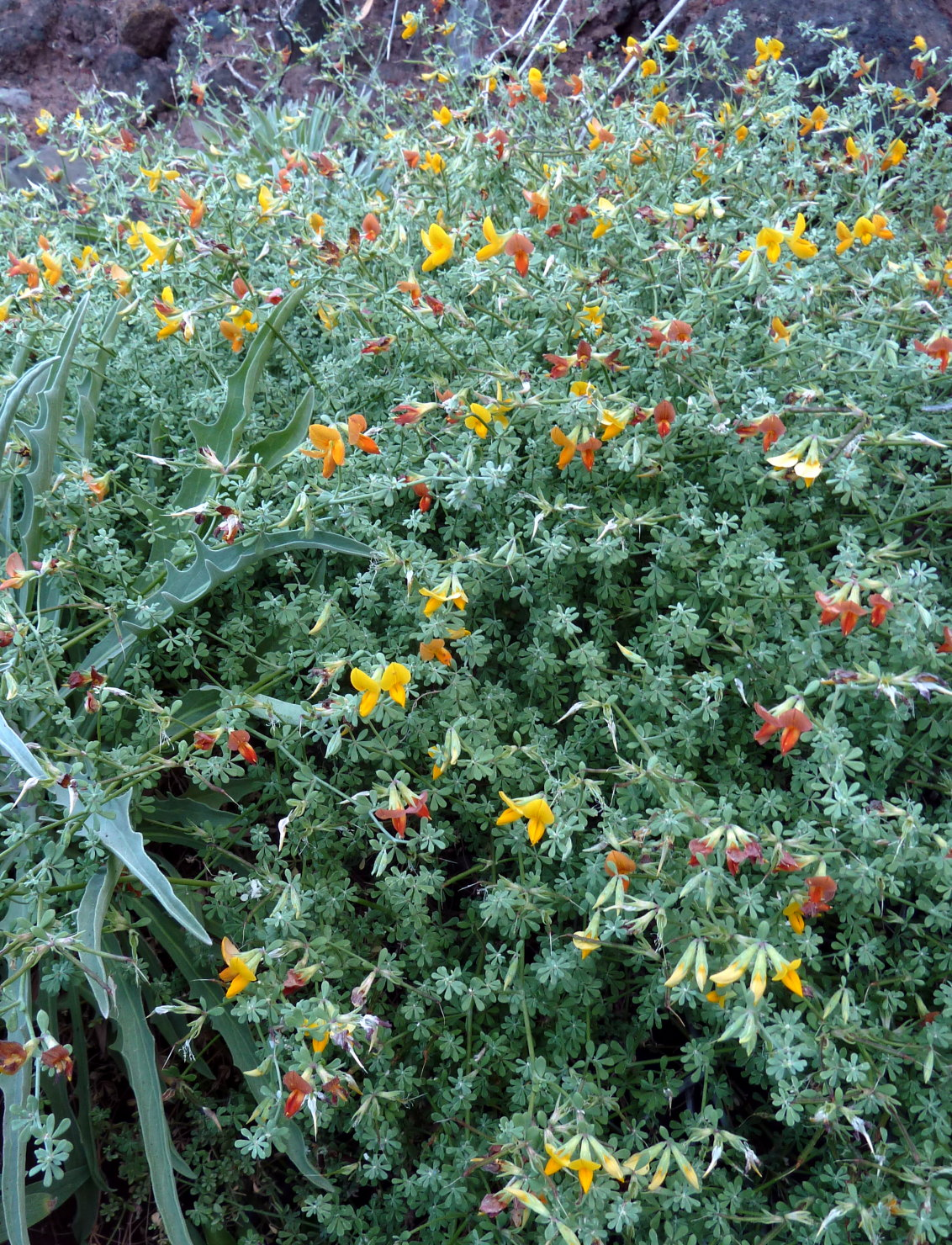

Scientific classification
- Kingdom: Plantae
- Clade: Tracheophytes
- Clade: Angiosperms
- Clade: Eudicots
- Clade: Rosids
- Order: Fabales
- Family: Fabaceae
- Subfamily: Faboideae
- Genus: Lotus
- Species: L. glaucus

Binomial name
- Lotus glaucus Aiton

Synonyms
- Lotus erythrorhizus Bolle; Lotus floridus (Lowe) Masf.; Lotus lancerottensis var. erythrorhizus (Bolle) G.Kunkel; Pedrosia florida Lowe; Pedrosia glauca (Aiton) Lowe

= Lotus glaucus =

Species of legume

Lotus glaucus is a species of flowering plant in the family Fabaceae, native to Madeira and the Salvage Islands. It is a perennial herbaceous plant with leaves made up of five leaflets. Its flowers are usually orange on opening. Lotus tenellus is included in a more broadly circumscribed L. glaucus by some authors, which extends its distribution to the Canary Islands.

== Description ==
Lotus glaucus is a perennial herbaceous plant, usually forming dense mats, but sometimes somewhat shrubby. The leaves are unstalked (sessile) with five pinnate leaflets. In L. glaucus subsp. glaucus, the two basal leaflets are 1.5–4.5 mm long; a short axis (rhachis), up to 2 mm long, separates the basal leaflets from the other three leaflets, which are 2–8 mm long, longer than the basal leaflets. The leaflets of L. glaucus subsp. salvagensis are generally longer, up to 13 mm. The stems and leaves have straight hairs which lie flat along the surface. The density of these hairs varies; some plants have dense hairs and appear silvery, others have fewer hairs and are greener. The flowers are arranged in umbels, usually with one to three flowers per umbel, occasionally up to five. The petals are initially orange to reddish, sometimes deep yellow, turning reddish-brown after fertilization. The upper petal (the standard) is shorter than or as long as the keel petals, which are 10–15 mm long. The wing petals are 9–14 mm long, usually shorter than the keel. The fruit pods are straight.

== Taxonomy ==
Lotus glaucus was first described in volume 3 of the first edition of Hortus Kewensis, dated to 1789. The title page gives the author of the work as William Aiton, although it is generally agreed that the descriptions were written by Daniel Solander or Jonas Carlsson Dryander. Some sources ascribe the name Lotus glaucus to Solander or to Dryander. However, the International Code of Nomenclature for algae, fungi, and plants, at Article 46.8, Example 37, explicitly states that the names in this edition of Hortus Kewensis are to be attributed to Aiton.

Lotus glaucus is placed in Lotus section Pedrosia, sometimes recognized as a subgenus or as a separate genus. The taxonomy of the species placed in this section is described as "problematic". L. glaucus belongs to a group that can be divided into different numbers of species. In 2006, Sandral et al. accepted three species – L. glaucus, L. tenellus and L. dumetorum – while noting that it was equally possible to treat L. glaucus as including the other two species. Other sources accept two species, sinking L. tenellus into L. glaucus, but recognizing L. dumetorum.

=== Subspecies ===
Sandral et al. recognize two subspecies:

- Lotus glaucus subsp. glaucus – Madeira; peduncles usually three to four times as long as the subtending leaves
- Lotus glaucus subsp. salvagensis – Salvage Islands; penduncles at most as long as the subtending leaves; leaflets usually larger

They also examined specimens from Fuerteventura, which may belong to the same species, possibly as an additional subspecies. However, they noted that "it is difficult to make a precise decision on its taxonomic identity".

Plants of the World Online accepts four subdivisions:

- Lotus glaucus var. erythrorhizus (Bolle) Brand – Canary Islands (Fuerteventura)
- Lotus glaucus var. floridus (Lowe) Brand – Madeira (Porto Santo Island)
- Lotus glaucus subsp. glaucus – Madeira
- Lotus glaucus subsp. salvagensis (R.P.Murray) Sandral & D.D.Sokoloff – Savage Islands

== Distribution and habitat ==
Lotus glaucus sensu stricto is native to Madeira (subsp. glaucus) and the Salvage or Savage Islands (subsp. salvagensis), and possibly also Fuerteventura in the Canary Islands if specimens collected from there belong to this species. When L. tenellus is included in L. glaucus, its distribution is extended to the coastal zone of Tenerife and Gran Canaria.
