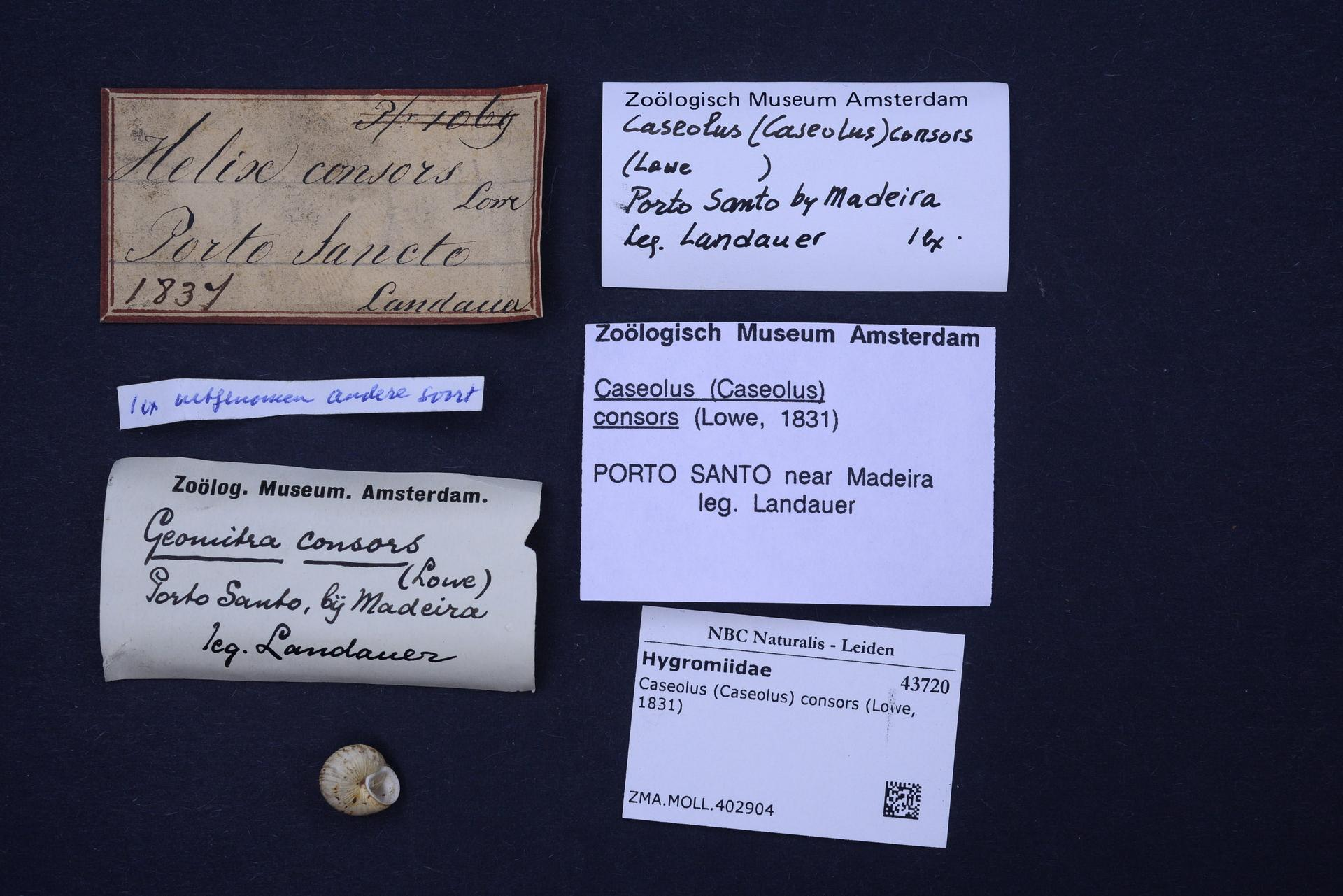

Conservation status
- Least Concern (IUCN 3.1)

Scientific classification
- Kingdom: Animalia
- Phylum: Mollusca
- Class: Gastropoda
- Order: Stylommatophora
- Family: Geomitridae
- Genus: Caseolus
- Species: C. consors

Binomial name
- Caseolus consors R.T. Lowe, 1831

= Caseolus consors =

Species of gastropod

Caseolus consors is a species of small air-breathing land snails, terrestrial pulmonate gastropod mollusks in the family Geomitridae. This species is endemic to Porto Santo Island, Portugal.
