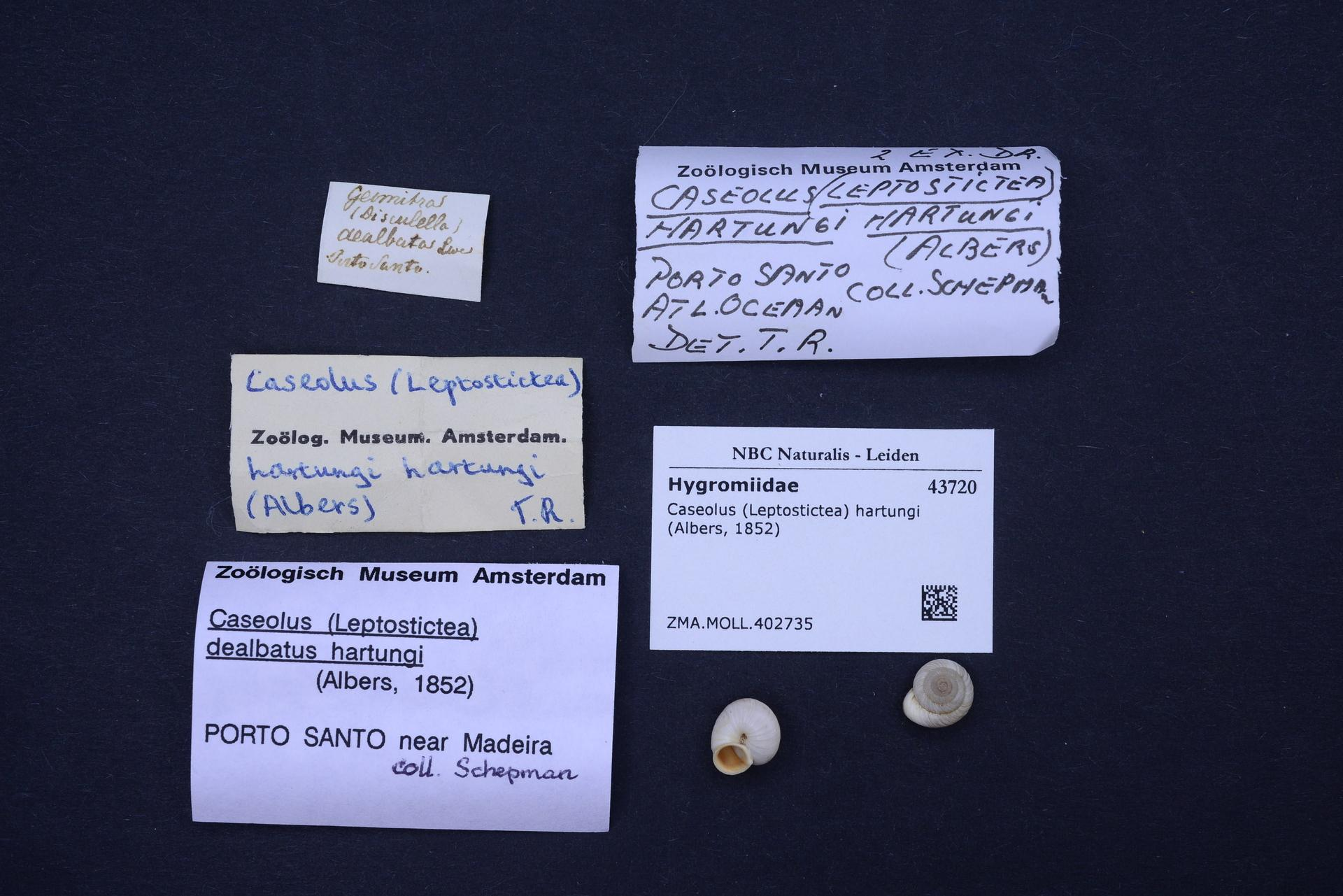

Conservation status
- Least Concern (IUCN 3.1)

Scientific classification
- Kingdom: Animalia
- Phylum: Mollusca
- Class: Gastropoda
- Order: Stylommatophora
- Family: Geomitridae
- Genus: Caseolus
- Species: C. hartungi

Binomial name
- Caseolus hartungi (Albers, 1852)

= Caseolus hartungi =

Species of gastropod

Caseolus hartungi is a species of small air-breathing land snails, terrestrial pulmonate gastropod mollusks in the family Geomitridae.

This species is endemic to Porto Santo, Portugal.

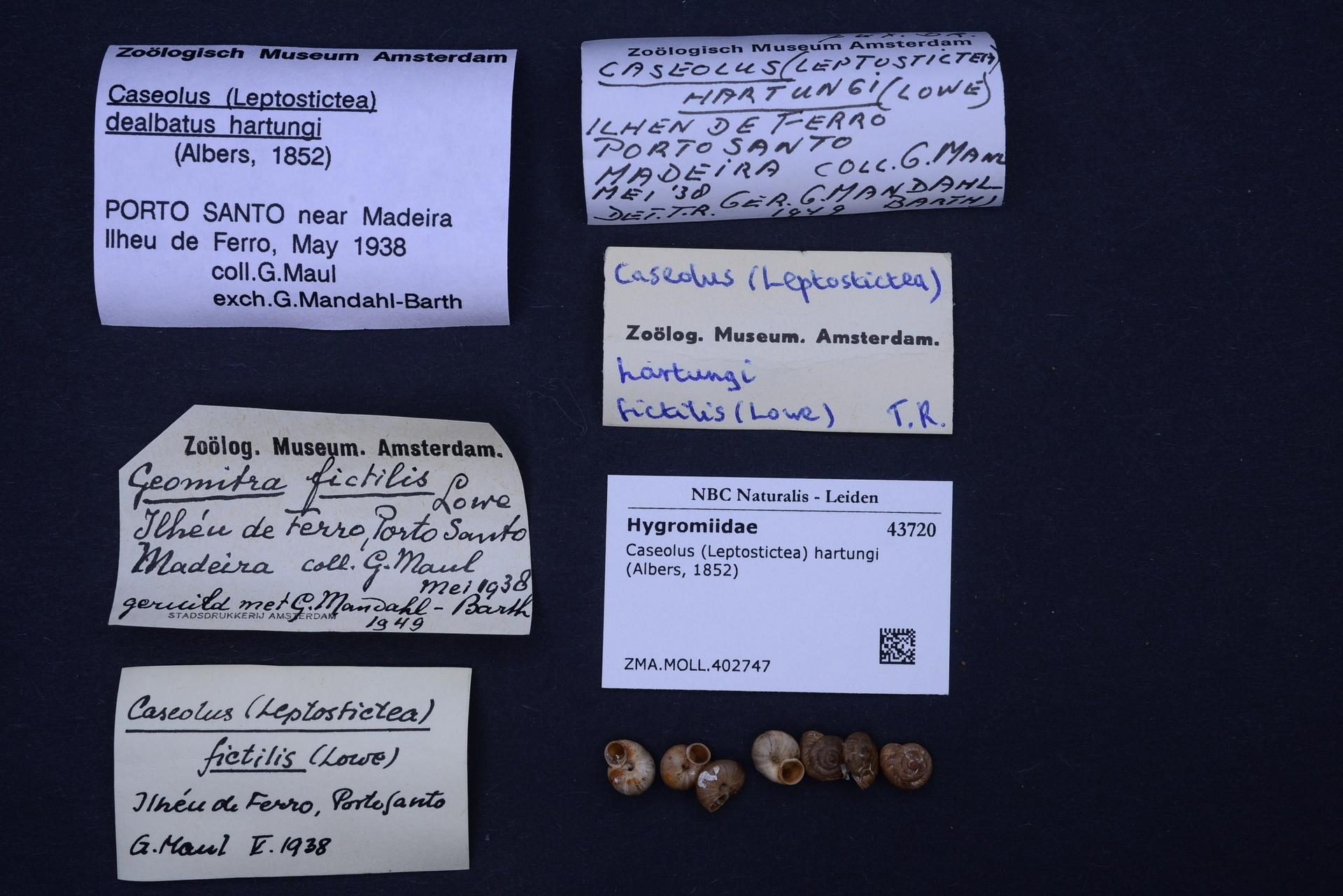
Caseolus hartungi fictilis specimen from Ilhéu de Ferro (Ferro Islet)
