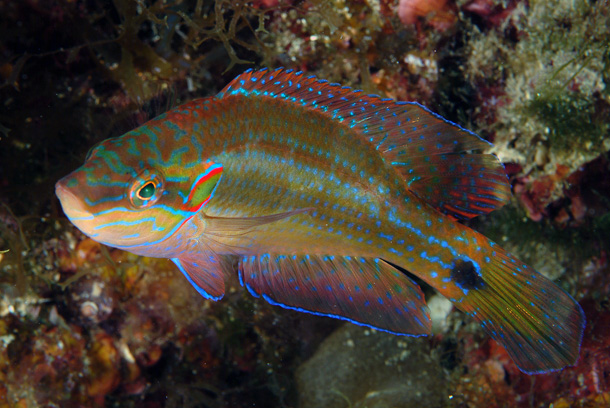

Conservation status
- Least Concern (IUCN 3.1)

Scientific classification
- Kingdom: Animalia
- Phylum: Chordata
- Class: Actinopterygii
- Division: Teleostei
- Order: Labriformes
- Family: Labridae
- Genus: Symphodus
- Species: S. ocellatus

Binomial name
- Symphodus ocellatus (Linnaeus, 1758)

Synonyms
- Labrus ocellatus Linnaeus, 1758; Labrus ocellaris Linnaeus, 1758 (ambiguous); Symphodus ocellatus (Linnaeus, 1758); Labrus ocellatus Forsskål, 1775 (ambiguous); Crenilabrus ocellatus (Forsskål, 1775) (ambiguous); Symphodus ocellatus (Forsskål, 1775) (ambiguous); Symphodus ocellatus ocellatus (Forsskål, 1775) (ambiguous); Labrus reticulatus Bonnaterre, 1788; Crenilabrus bertini Pras, 1961

= Ocellated wrasse =

Species of fish

The ocellated wrasse (Symphodus ocellatus) is a species of wrasse native to the eastern Atlantic Ocean and throughout the Mediterranean Sea, the Black Sea, and the Sea of Azov. It inhabits areas with rocks and eelgrass at depths from 1 to 30 m (3.3 to 98.4 ft). It feeds on various marine invertebrates. This species can reach 12 cm (4.7 in) in standard length. It can also be found in the aquarium trade.

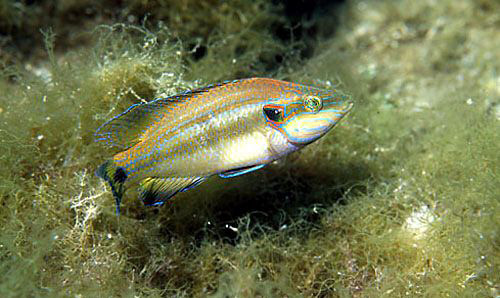
Symphodus ocellatus

These fish live about two to three years. There are three distinct male forms. There are nesting males, sneaker males, and satellite males. The nesting males are the largest of the three and the most brightly colored. The sneaker males are the smallest of the three types and the most dull in color, and actually closely resemble the female phenotype. Satellite males are an intermediate in size and color between the large nesting male and smaller sneaker male.

Nesting males court females, build and guard nests, and provide parental care for the offspring. Nests are made of harvested algae. Sneaker males do not court females, do not provide parental care and they join in when a female and nesting male are mating in an attempt to fertilize the eggs before the nesting male. Satellite males assist in courting the females, they chase away sneaker males, but they do not provide parental care for the offspring.

The male types are determined in early development. If a male fish grows quickly, it will be a satellite male in its first breeding season then will become a nesting male in its second. For the slower growing males, they will be a sneaker male in their first breeding season, then a satellite male in their second. Breeding season occurs from May to June.
