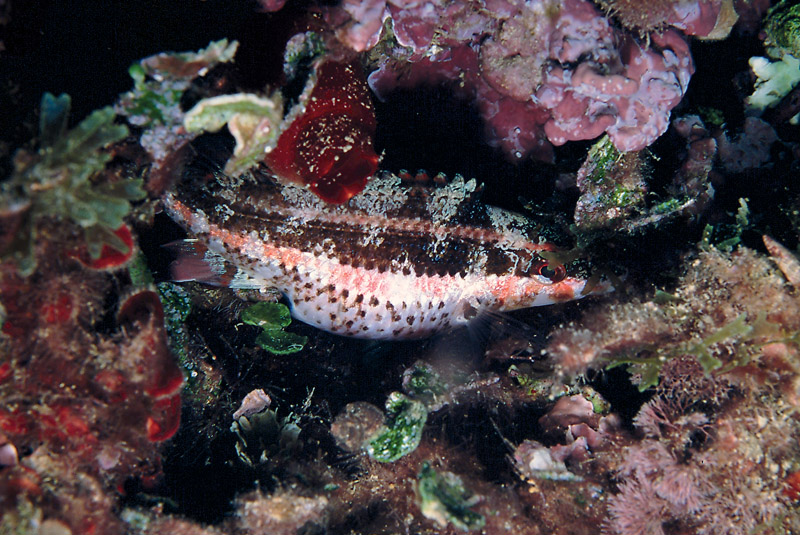

Conservation status
- Least Concern (IUCN 3.1)

Scientific classification
- Kingdom: Animalia
- Phylum: Chordata
- Class: Actinopterygii
- Order: Labriformes
- Family: Labridae
- Genus: Symphodus
- Species: S. doderleini

Binomial name
- Symphodus doderleini D. S. Jordan, 1890

Synonyms
- Crenilabrus doderleini (D. S. Jordan, 1890)

= Symphodus doderleini =

Species of fish

Symphodus doderleini is a species of wrasse native to the coasts of the Mediterranean Sea through the Sea of Marmara. It can be found in beds of eelgrass at depths of from 2 to 40 m (6.6 to 131.2 ft), and can reach 10 cm (3.9 in) in standard length.
