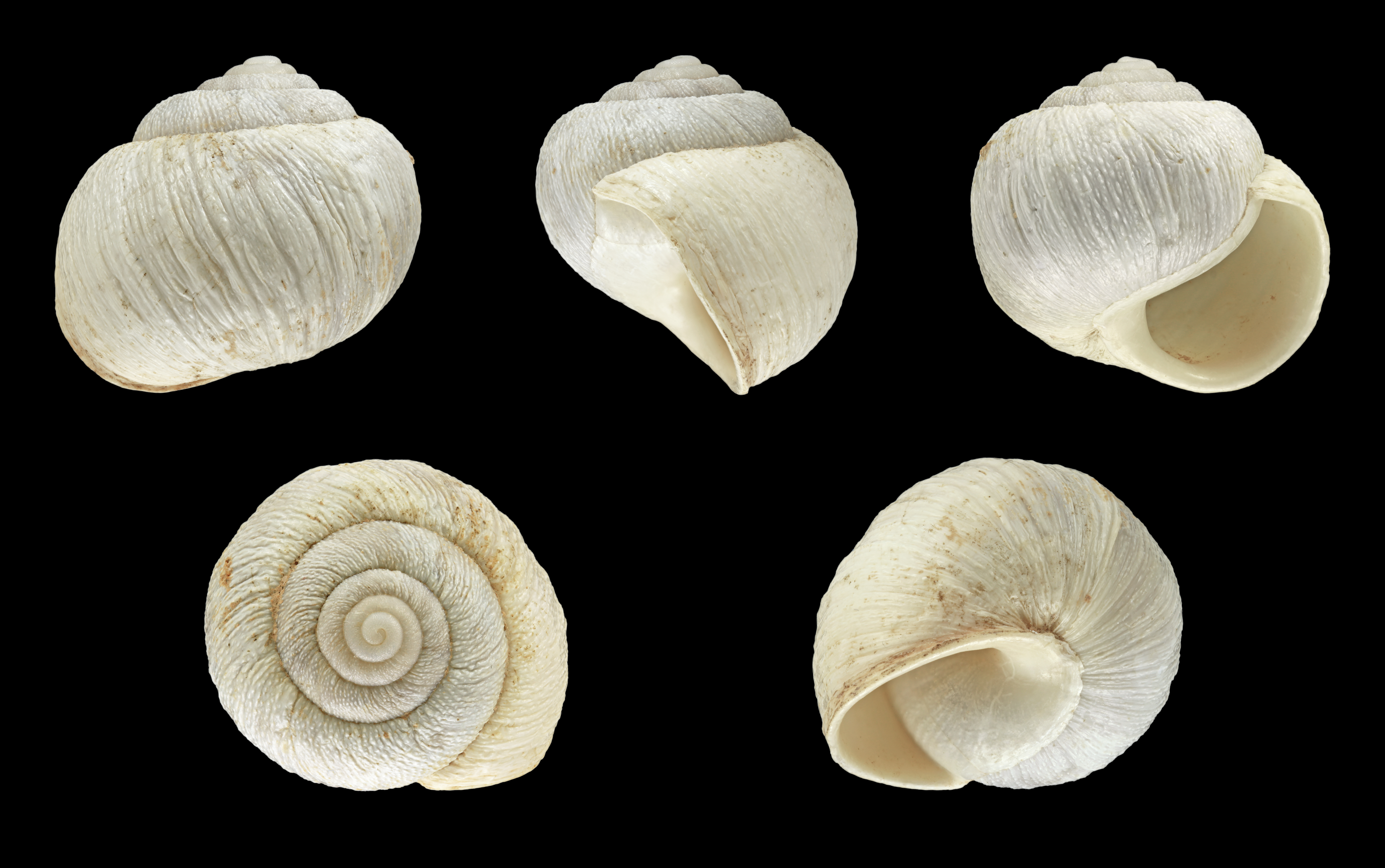
- Caseolus bowdichianus

Scientific classification
- Kingdom: Animalia
- Phylum: Mollusca
- Class: Gastropoda
- Order: Stylommatophora
- Family: Geomitridae
- Subfamily: Geomitrinae
- Tribe: Geomitrini
- Genus: Caseolus; R. T. Lowe, 1852

Synonyms
- Caseolus (Caseolus) R. T. Lowe, 1852· accepted, alternate representation; Caseolus (Helicomela) R. T. Lowe, 1855· accepted, alternate representation; Caseolus (Leptostictea) Mandahl-Barth, 1950· accepted, alternate representation; Helix (Caseolus) R. T. Lowe, 1852; Helix (Helicomela) R. T. Lowe, 1855 (basionym); Ochthephila (Caseolus) R. T. Lowe, 1852

= Caseolus =

Genus of gastropods

Caseolus is a genus of land snails in the family Geomitridae.

The name Caseolus is masculine and means "little cheese", based on the shape of the shell of species in this genus.

== Species ==
Species include:

- Caseolus abjectus R. T. Lowe, 1831
- Caseolus baixoensis Walden, 1983
- Caseolus bowdichianus (Férrusac, 1832)
- Caseolus calculus R. T. Lowe, 1855
- Caseolus calvus R. T. Lowe, 1831
- Caseolus commixtus R. T. Lowe, 1855
- Caseolus consors R. T. Lowe, 1831
- Caseolus galeatus (R. T. Lowe, 1862)
- Caseolus hartungi Albers, 1852
- † Caseolus heberti (Deshayes, 1863)
- Caseolus innominatus J. E. Gray, 1825
- Caseolus leptostictus R. T. Lowe, 1831
- Caseolus pittae (Paiva, 1866)
- Caseolus punctulatus G. B. Sowerby I, 1824
- Caseolus setulosus (R. T. Lowe, 1831)
- † Caseolus sphaerulus R. T. Lowe, 1852
- Caseolus subcalliferus Reeve, 1854
