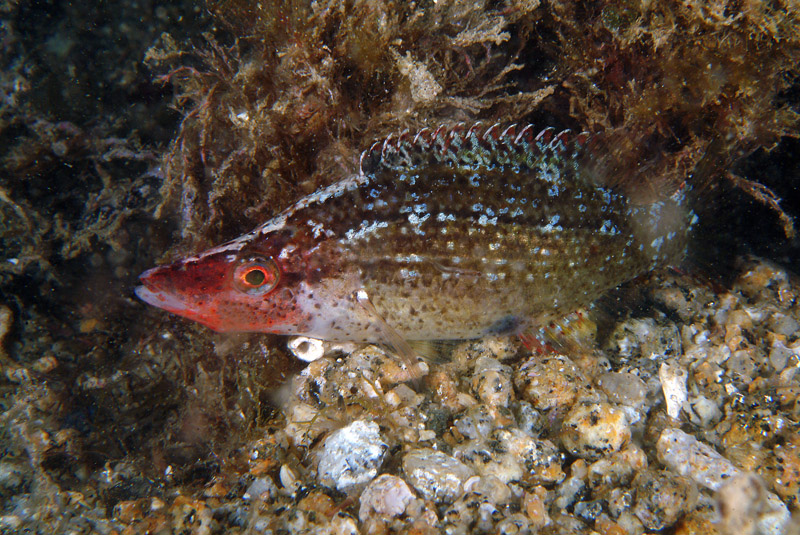

Conservation status
- Least Concern (IUCN 3.1)

Scientific classification
- Kingdom: Animalia
- Phylum: Chordata
- Class: Actinopterygii
- Order: Labriformes
- Family: Labridae
- Genus: Symphodus
- Species: S. rostratus

Binomial name
- Symphodus rostratus (Bloch, 1791)

Synonyms
- Lutjanus rostratus Bloch, 1791; Coricus rostratus (Bloch, 1791); Crenilabrus rostratus (Bloch, 1791); Labrus scina Forsskål, 1775; Crenilabrus scina (Forsskål, 1775); Symphodus scina (Forsskål, 1775); Lutjanus virescens Bloch, 1791; Coricus virescens (Bloch, 1791); Symphodus fulvescens Rafinesque, 1810; Lutjanus rubescens A. Risso, 1810; Coricus rubescens (A. Risso, 1810); Lutjanus lamarckii A. Risso, 1810; Coricus lamarckii (A. Risso, 1810); Coricus brama Nordmann, 1840

= Pointed-snout wrasse =

Species of fish

The pointed-snout wrasse (Symphodus rostratus), also known as the long-snout wrasse, is a species of marine ray-finned fish, a wrasse from the family Labridae which is native to coastal waters of the Mediterranean Sea and the Black Sea. This species can also be found in the aquarium trade and is occasionally taken in artisanal fisheries.

== Description ==
The pointed-snout wrasse is a slender species of wrasse with a small head and an elongated and pointed snout. It has a long dorsal fin with 14–16 spines in the anterior portion and 9–12 branched rays in its posterior part. The anal fin is short with 3 spines and 9–11 branched rays. The body is covered in large scales and is an overall green or brownish colour with darker markings on the flanks and back. They alo normally have a white stripe on the head running from the snout to the base of the dorsal fin. A four year old fish was measured at a standard length of 10.3 centimetres (4.1 in). The males become more brightly coloured in the breeding season.

== Distribution ==
The pointed-snout wrasse is found throughout the coastal waters of the Mediterranean Sea and in the western part of the Black Sea.

== Habitat and biology ==
In Italy

The pointed-snout wrasse occurs near rocks in beds of the eelgrass Zostera and Posidonia at depths of 1 to 30 meters (3.3 to 98.4 ft). it occurs in small groups. It feeds on small benthic organisms such as molluscs, crustaceans and echinoderms and the distinctive shape of the snout suggests that it is specialised for picking prey out of crevices. Spawning occurs in spring, the male builds a nest from plant material which he guards, one or more females lay adhesive eggs into the nest. They are sexually mature at a year old and they live to 3–4 years. Males grow faster than females. After hatching the young feed on plankton for the first few weeks of their life.

== Human usage ==
The pointed-snout wrasse is eaten if caught in local artisanal fisheries, it is often used in fish soup.
