= Cal Islet =

Island in the Madeira Archipelago, Portugal

Native name: Ilhéu da Cal
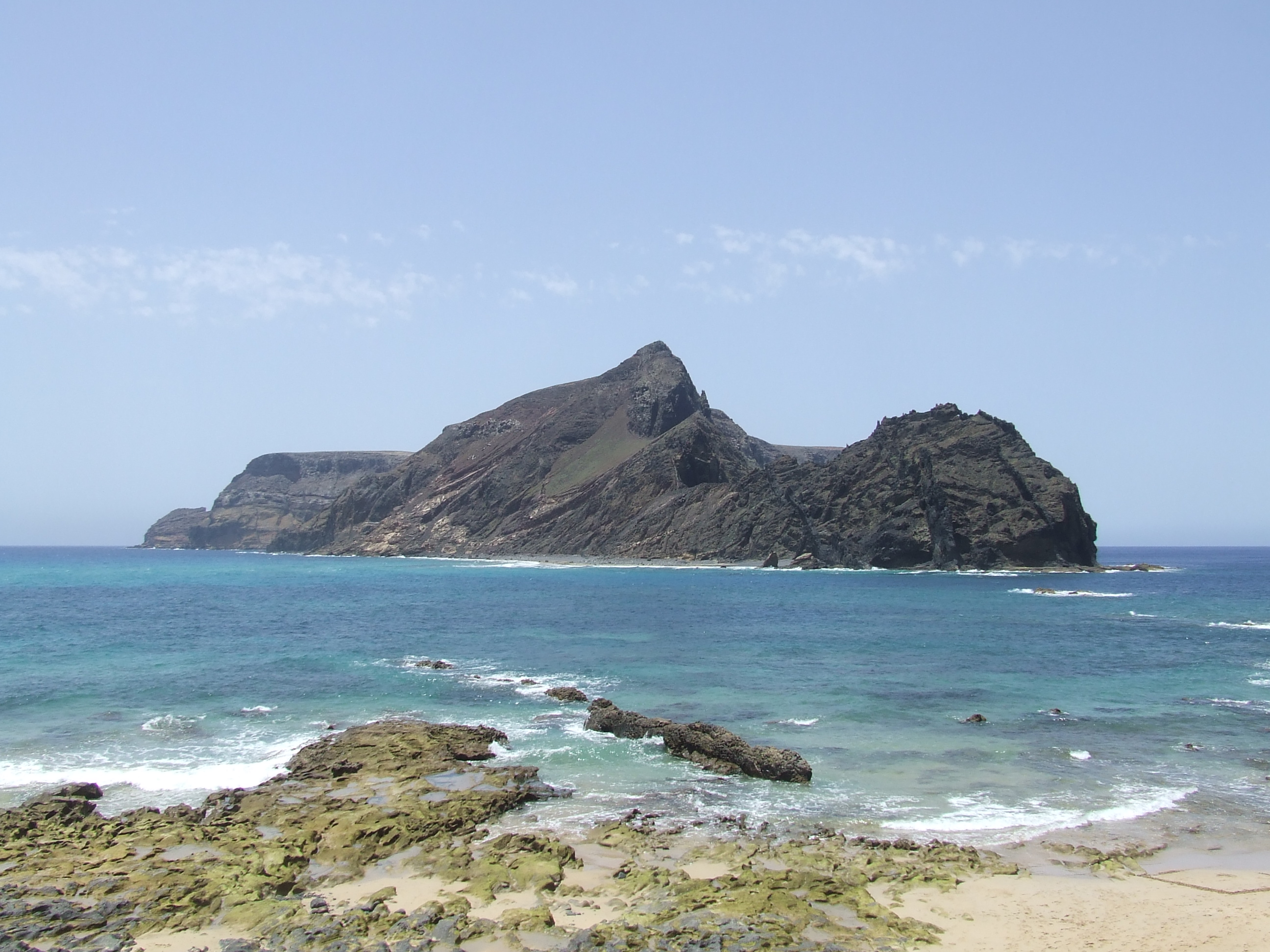
- Cal Islet, viewed from Porto Santo

- Location within the Municipality of Porto Santo

Geography
- Location: Atlantic Ocean
- Coordinates: 33.0089°N 16.3869°W
- Total islands: 1
- Area: 1.40 km^{2} (0.54 sq mi)
- Highest elevation: 178 m (584 ft)

Administration
- Portugal
- Autonomous Region: Madeira
- Municipality: Porto Santo
- Freguesia: Porto Santo

Demographics
- Population: 0

Cal Islet (Portuguese: Ilhéu da Cal, also: Ilhéu de Baixo) is a small island about 500 m (1,600 ft) south of Porto Santo Island, in the Madeira Archipelago, Portugal. With an area of 1.40 km^{2} (0.54 sq mi), Cal is the largest of six islets close to Porto Santo. The highest point is 178 m (584 ft). The islet has never been inhabited.

== History ==
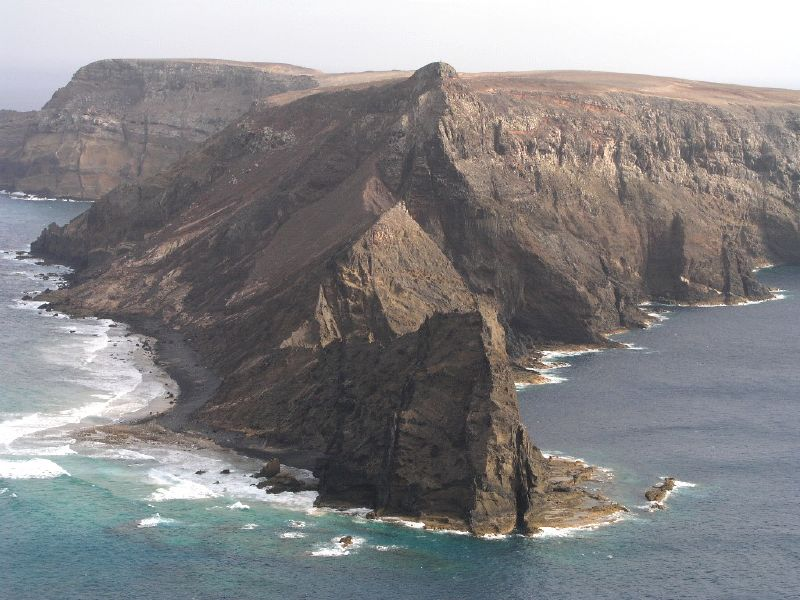
Cal Islet

Cal Islet houses an important testimony to the history and culture of Porto Santo. It was once mined for lime (cal in Portuguese). Its extraction led to several accidents, one of which killed sixteen workers, victims of a mine collapse. The mines are no longer active, but remnants are still intact and can be visited with a proper license and specialized escort.

The construction of a cable car was planned to connect the tip of Calheta (in Porto Santo) to the islet. The project was abandoned because the large numbers of visitors would have endangered the regeneration of the islet's fragile ecosystem.

== Ecological Preservation ==
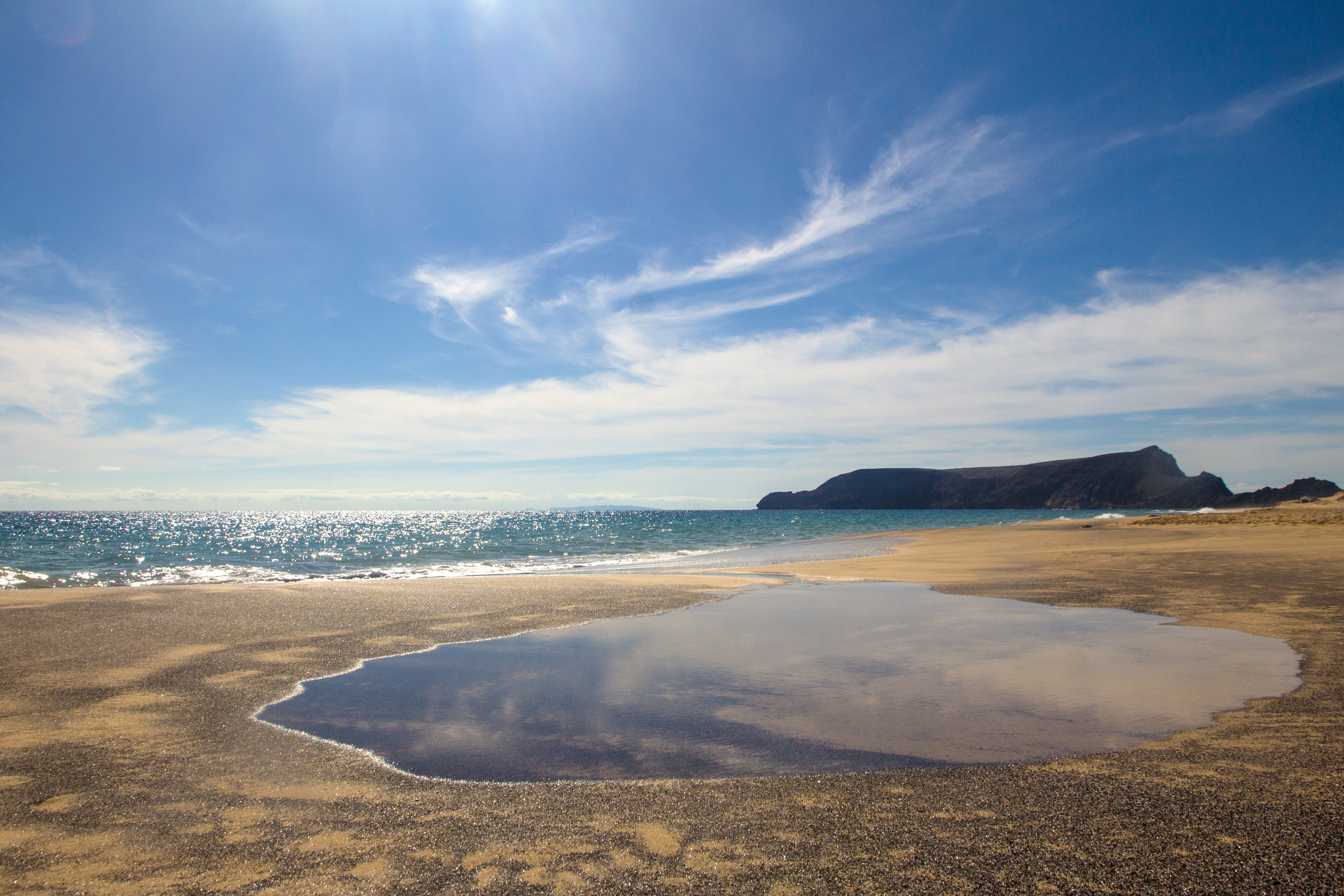
Side view of the Island seen from a beach in Porto Santo

Despite its rough appearance, this islet is home to a very rich flora, which includes the usual coastal shrubs and some traces of laurisilva, probably due to its difficult access. It is also a breeding ground for at least four species of birds, the Atlantic canary, the Berthelot's pipit, the plain swift and the little shearwater and home to endemic land snails, Amphorella cimensis and Leiostyla relevata. For these reasons, its ecosystem is protected by the Portuguese PDM and Rede Natura 2000.

In these areas with very high ecological value and great vulnerability to human pressure or reduced capacity for regeneration, only activities of a scientific nature are allowed and, exceptionally, in previously selected areas, places of observation in the scope of leisure and recreational uses.

— Municipal Master Plan of Porto Santo, article no.54.
