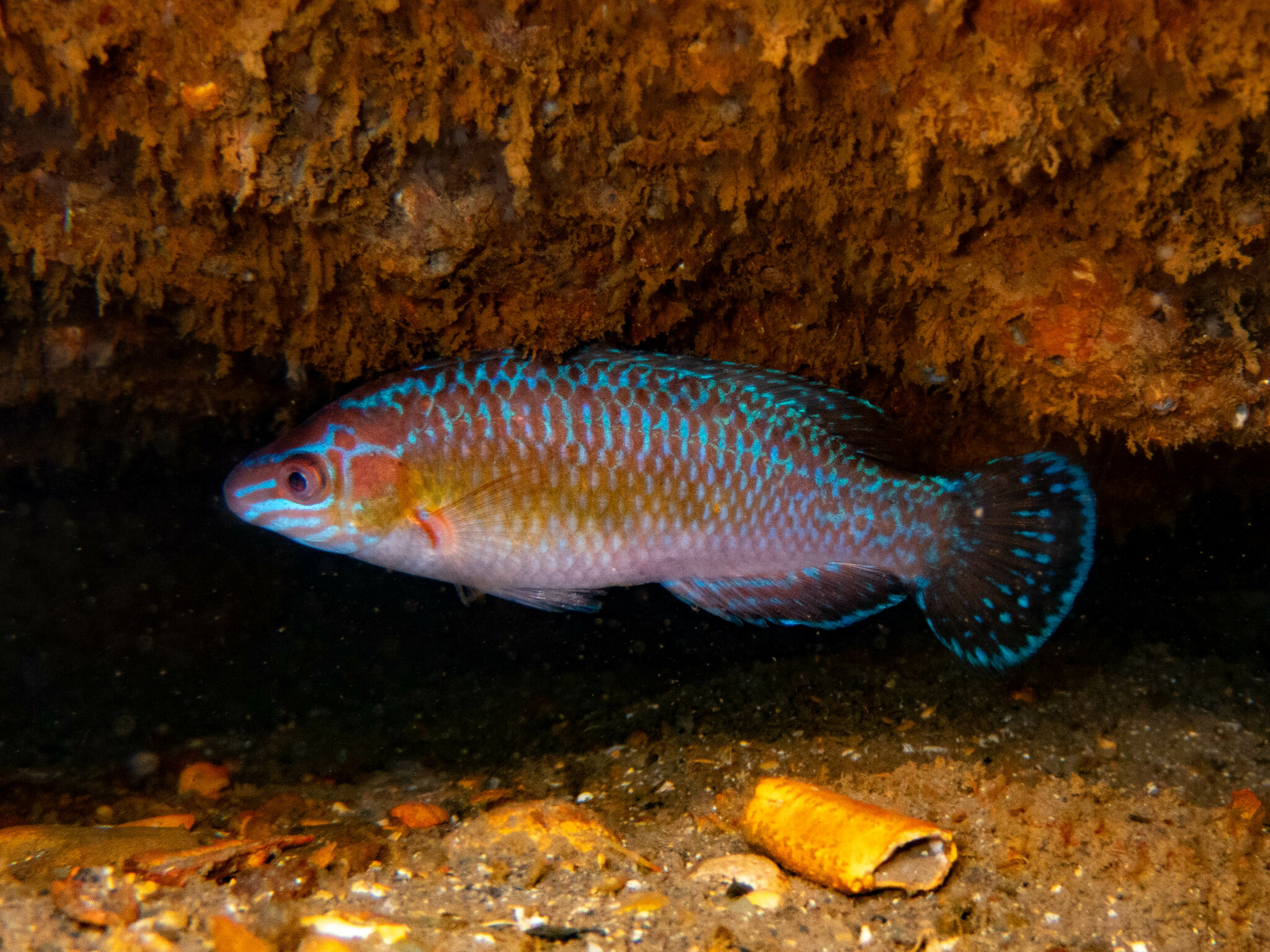
- Centrolabrus exoletus

Scientific classification
- Kingdom: Animalia
- Phylum: Chordata
- Class: Actinopterygii
- Order: Labriformes
- Family: Labridae
- Subfamily: Labrinae
- Genus: Centrolabrus; Günther, 1861

Type species
- Labrus exoletus Linnaeus, 1758

= Centrolabrus =

Genus of fishes

Centrolabrus is a small genus of wrasses from the family Labridae which are native to the eastern Atlantic Ocean.

== Species ==
The currently recognized species in this genus are:

- Centrolabrus exoletus (Linnaeus, 1758) (rock cook)
- Centrolabrus melanocercus (Risso, 1810)
