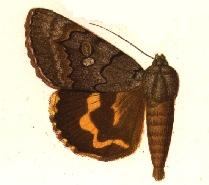

Scientific classification
- Kingdom: Animalia
- Phylum: Arthropoda
- Class: Insecta
- Order: Lepidoptera
- Superfamily: Noctuoidea
- Family: Erebidae
- Genus: Catocala
- Species: C. consors

Binomial name
- Catocala consors Smith, 1797

Synonyms
- Phalaena consors; Catabapta consors; Catocala pensacola Reiff, 1919

= Catocala consors =

Species of moth

Catocala consors, the consort underwing, is a moth of the family Erebidae. It is found from Maine and Connecticut south to Florida and west to Texas and eastern Oklahoma.

The wingspan is over 70 mm. Adults are on wing from April to July depending on the location. There is one generation per year.

The larvae feed on Amorpha fructicosa and Carya species.

== Subspecies ==
- Catocala consors consors
- Catocala consors sorsconi Barnes & Benjamin, 1924 (Maine)
