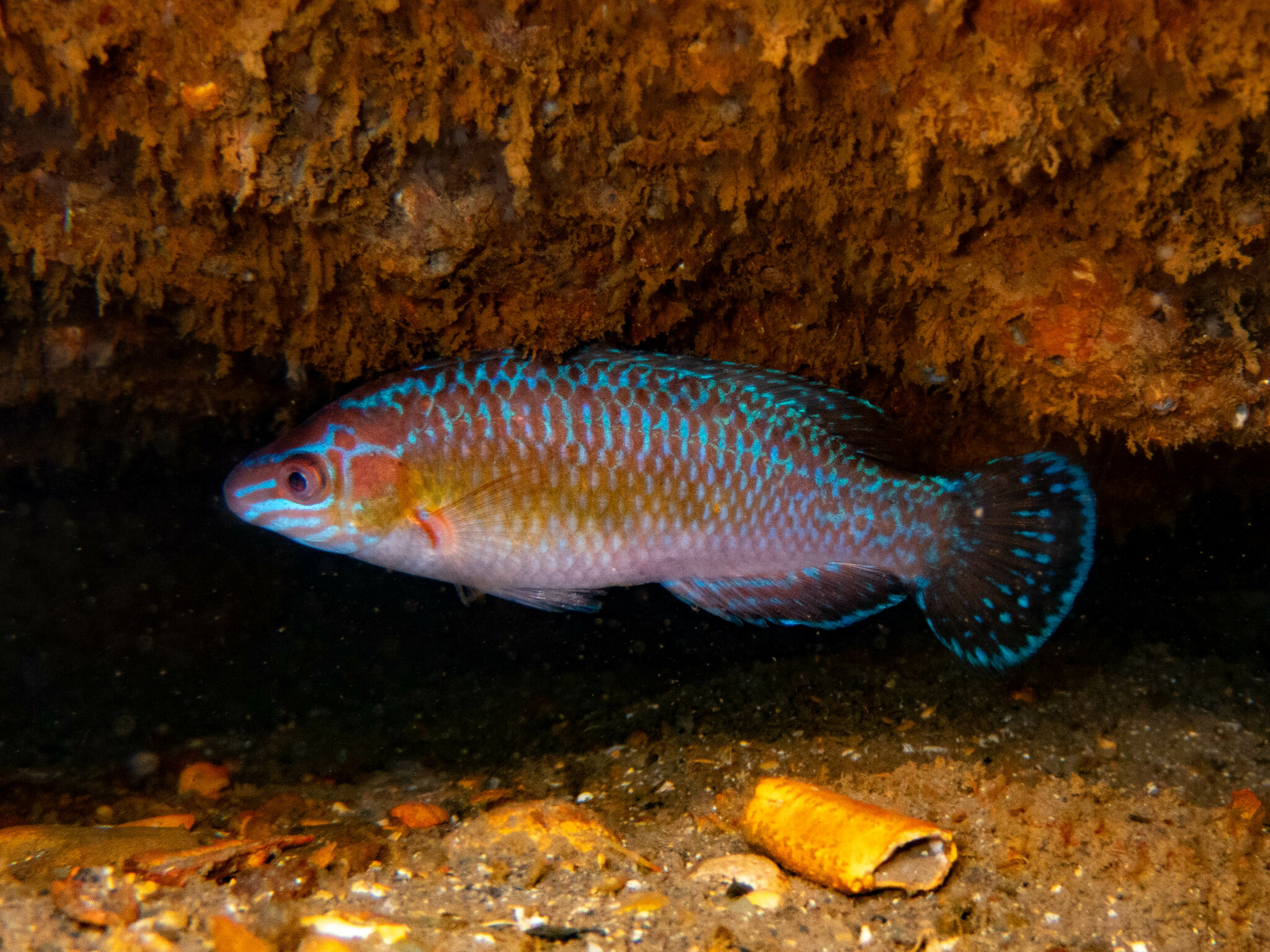

Conservation status
- Least Concern (IUCN 3.1)

Scientific classification
- Kingdom: Animalia
- Phylum: Chordata
- Class: Actinopterygii
- Division: Teleostei
- Order: Labriformes
- Family: Labridae
- Genus: Centrolabrus
- Species: C. exoletus

Binomial name
- Centrolabrus exoletus Linnaeus, 1758

Synonyms
- List: Labrus exoletus Linnaeus, 1758; Acantholabrus exoletus (Linnaeus, 1758); Crenilabrus exoletus (Linnaeus, 1758); Labrus chinensis Linnaeus, 1758; Labrus pentacanthus Lacépède, 1801; Crenilabrus microstoma Thompson, 1837; Acantholabrus microstoma (Thompson, 1837)

= Rock cook =

Species of fish

The rock cook (Centrolabrus exoletus), or small-mouthed wrasse, is a species of marine ray-finned fish from the wrasse family Labridae which is found in the eastern Atlantic Ocean off the coasts of Europe.

== Taxonomy ==
Centrolabrus exoletus is the type species of the genus Centrolabrus. It was originally formally described by Carolus Linnaeus in 1758 in the 10th Edition of the Systema Naturae.

== Description ==
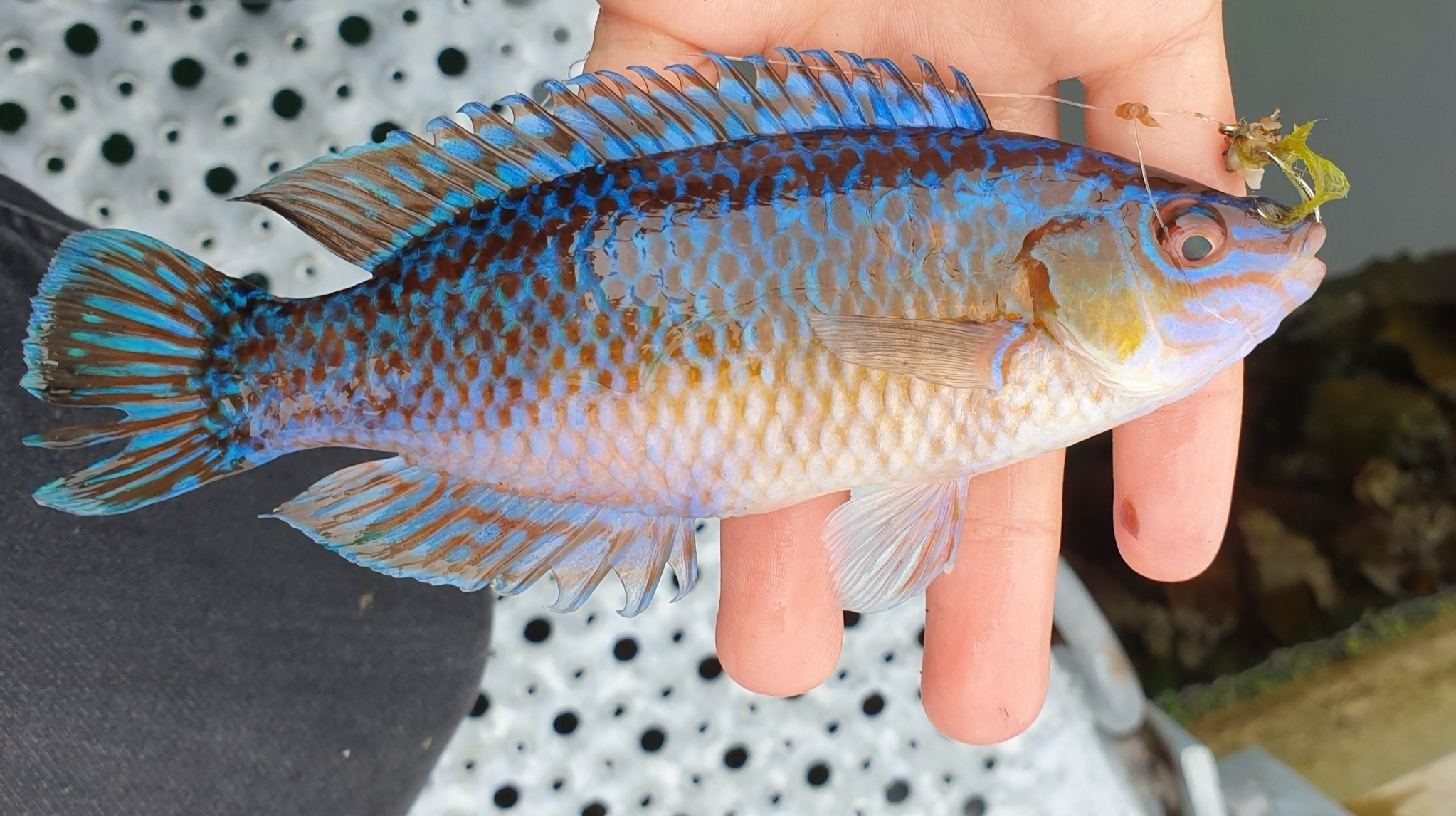
In Norway

The rock cook is a small wrasse in which the adults range in length from 10–15 centimetres (3.9–5.9 in). Its mouth is relatively small and has thick, fleshy lips. This species is normally reddish-brown above fading to yellowish-silver on the flanks and to pale silvery-white on the belly. The males have iridescent blue streaks on their dorsal, anal and caudal fins as well as on their heads. The caudal fin has a dark vertical bar. There is a single row of small teeth in the jaws.

== Distribution ==
The rock cook is found in the eastern Atlantic where it is endemic to European waters from Norway to Portugal. It has been claimed off eastern Greenland but these records are regarded as doubtful. It is absent from the Baltic Sea and has been observed once in the Mediterranean Sea off Málaga in 1981. In the waters off Britain and Ireland it is absent from the eastern English Channel and the eastern coast of England.

== Habitat and biology ==
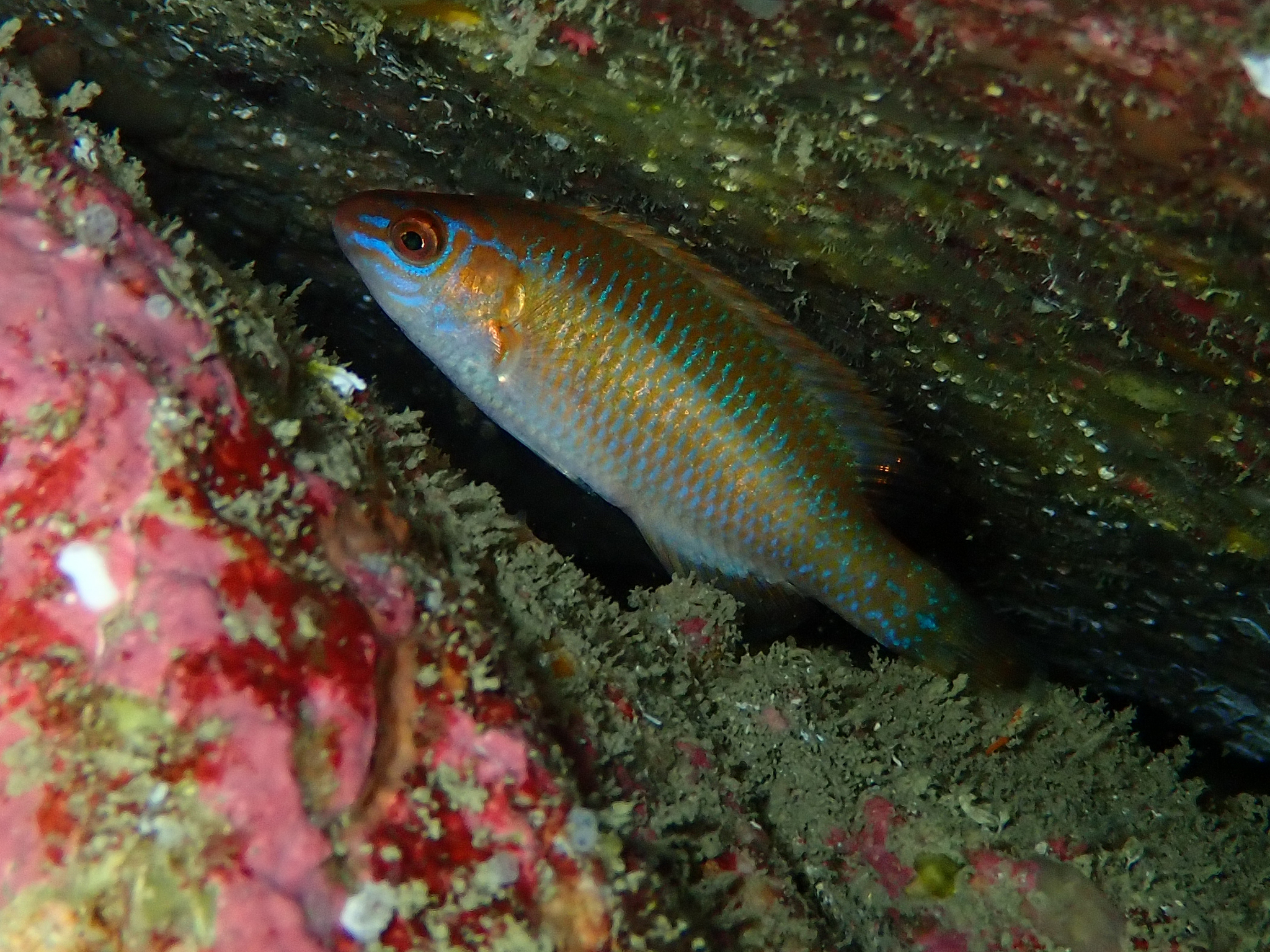
In France

The rock cook is found mainly among seaweeds and seagrass beds on or near rocks and boulders normally at depths of less than 25 metres (82 ft), although it has been claimed at depth of 35 metres (115 ft) off the United Kingdom. The female creates a nest from fine seaweeds in which she lays her eggs during the summer months. Its diet consists of small benthic invertebrates, especially crustaceans. Males grow faster than the females, by the age of 5 years old the males attain an average length of 13 centimetres (5.1 in) while the females average length is 12 centimetres (4.7 in). The rock cook also acts as a cleaner fish and a study off the coast of the Algarve, Portugal found that it was the most important species of cleaner fish present in that area. It is a facultative cleaner fish which rather than maintain a territory where its client fish seek it out small groups of rock cooks actively search for client fish, primarily the brown wrasse in this study, and clean and consume crustacean ectoparasites, all from the family Gnathiidae, off the client fish.

== Human uses ==
The rock cook is used in the aquaculture of the Atlantic salmon as a cleaner fish.
