= Richard Thomas Lowe =

English naturalist (1802–1874)

Richard Lowe
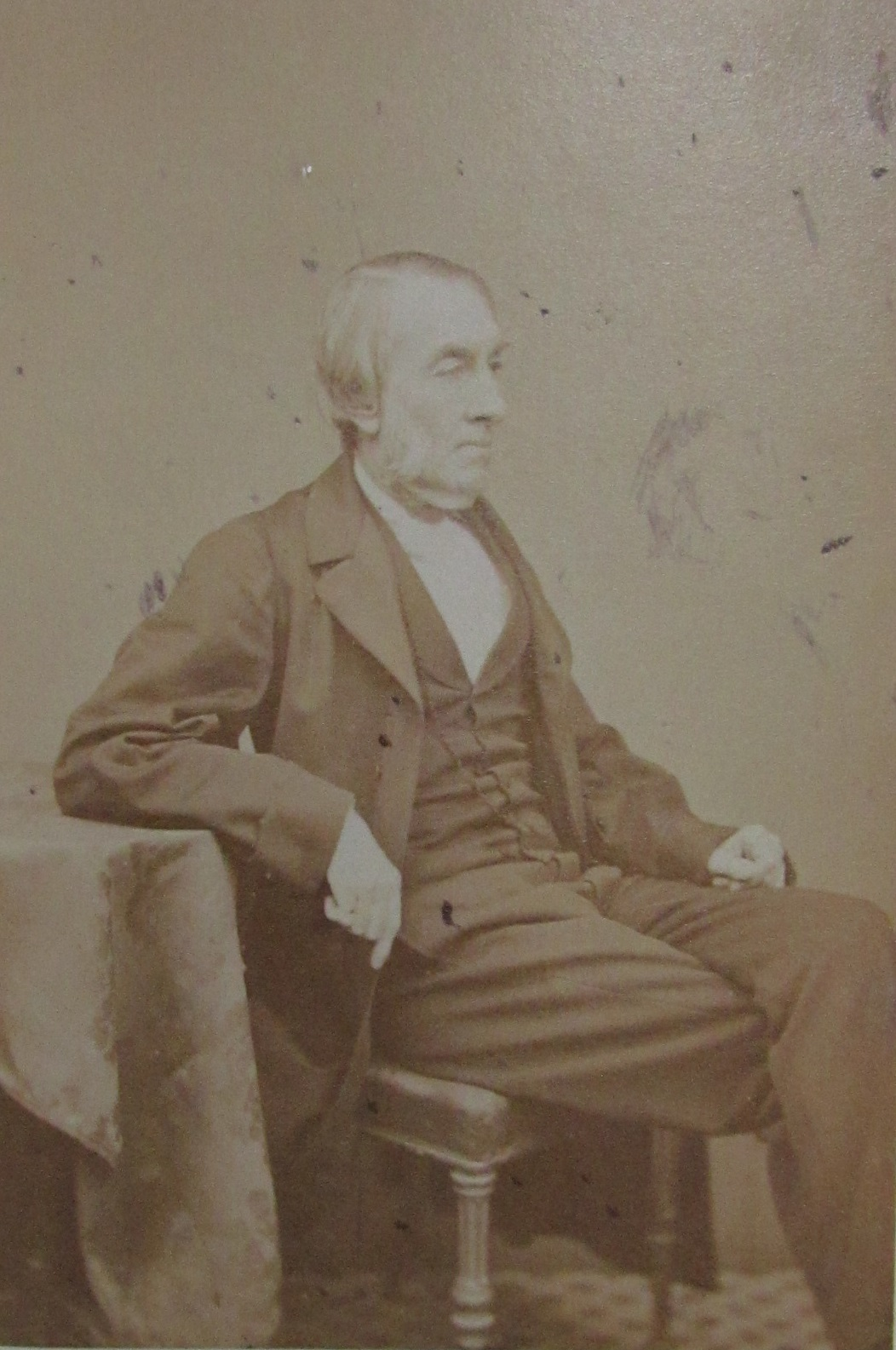
- Born: 1802
- Died: 1874 (aged 71–72); Isles of Scilly
- Citizenship: United Kingdom
- Education: Christ's College, Cambridge
- Scientific career
- Fields: botany, ichthyology, malacology
- Author abbrev. (botany): Lowe
- Author abbrev. (zoology): Lowe

Richard Thomas Lowe (1802–1874) was an English botanist, ichthyologist, malacologist, and clergyman. In 1825, he graduated from Christ's College, Cambridge, and in the same year he took holy orders. In 1832, he became a clergyman in the Madeira Islands, where he was also a part-time naturalist, extensively studying the local flora and fauna. He wrote a book on the Madeiran flora. He died in 1874 when the ship he was on was wrecked off the Isles of Scilly.

== Taxa ==
Lowe named and described numerous molluscan taxa, including:

- Caseolus, a land snail genus and eight species within it
- Lemniscia, a land snail genus and two species within it

== See also ==
- Category:Taxa named by Richard Thomas Lowe
