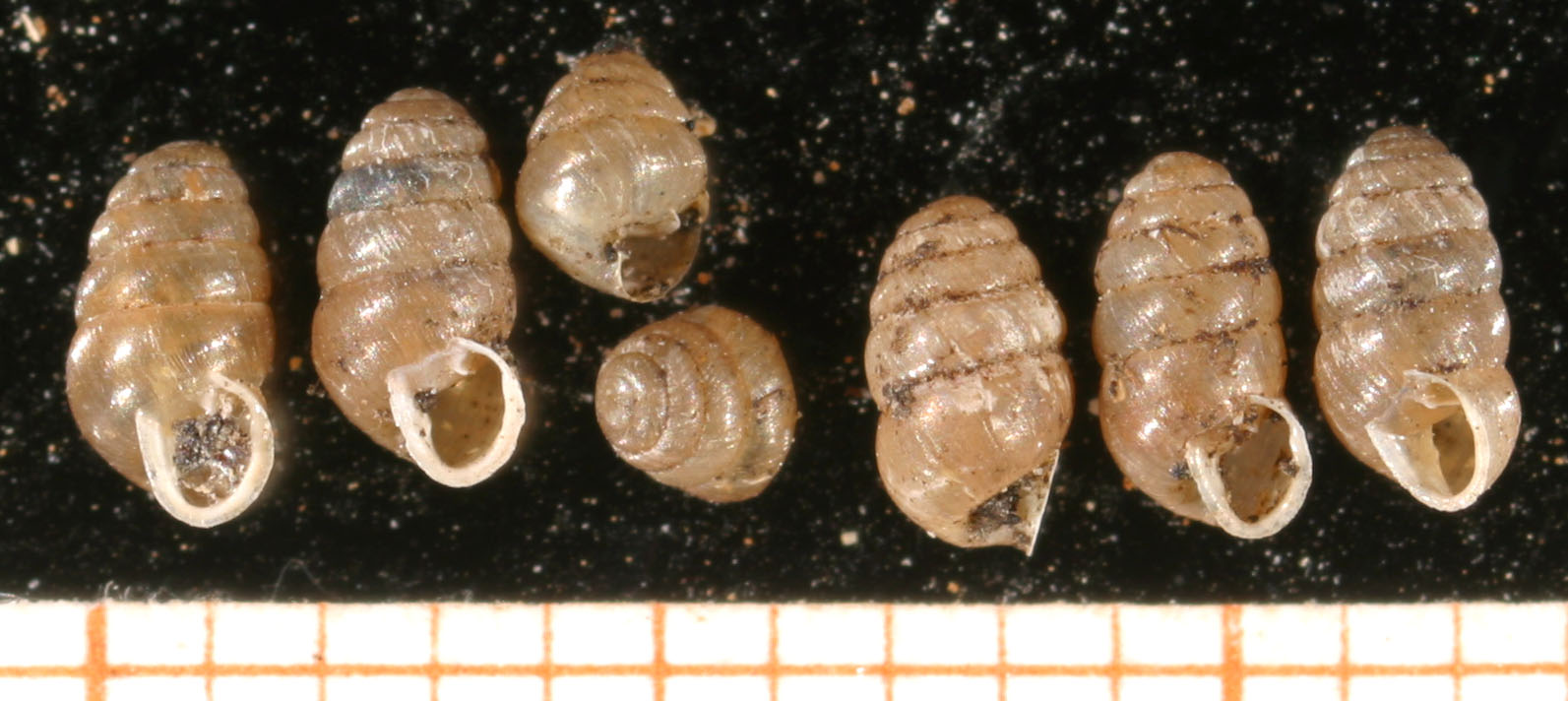
- A group of shells of Lauria cylindracea

Scientific classification
- Kingdom: Animalia
- Phylum: Mollusca
- Class: Gastropoda
- Order: Stylommatophora
- Suborder: Helicina
- Infraorder: Pupilloidei
- Superfamily: Pupilloidea
- Family: Lauriidae; Steenberg, 1925

Type species
- Laubierina peregrinator Warén & Bouchet, 1990

= Lauriidae =

Family of gastropods

Lauriidae is a family of land snails. It is classified within the informal group Orthurethra, itself belonging to the clade Stylommatophora within the clade Eupulmonata (according to the taxonomy of the Gastropoda by Bouchet & Rocroi, 2005).

The family Lauriidae has no subfamilies.

== Genera ==
Genera include:

- Hemilauria Waldén, 1983
- Lauria Gray, 1840
- Leiostyla R. T. Lowe, 1852

Genera brought into synonymy

- Alvearella R. T. Lowe, 1852: synonym of Leiostyla R. T. Lowe, 1852
- Caucasica Caziot & Margier, 1909: synonym of Leiostyla R. T. Lowe, 1852 (invalid; not O. Boettger, 1877)
- Caucasipupa Pilsbry, 1926: synonym of Leiostyla (Euxinolauria) Lindholm, 1924: synonym of Leiostyla R. T. Lowe, 1852
- Charadrobia Albers, 1854: synonym of Leiostyla R. T. Lowe, 1852
- Eruca Swainson, 1840: synonym of Lauria Gray, 1840
- Eryma Albers, 1854: synonym of Leiostyla (Craticula) R. T. Lowe, 1852 represented as Leiostyla R. T. Lowe, 1852
- Euxinolauria Lindholm, 1924: synonym of Leiostyla R. T. Lowe, 1852 (junior synonym)
- Gastrodon R. T. Lowe, 1852: synonym of Lauria Gray, 1840
- Liostyla E. von Martens, 1860: synonym of Leiostyla R. T. Lowe, 1852
- Petrarca Pilsbry, 1922: synonym of Hemilauria (Senilauria) Pilsbry, 1928 represented as Hemilauria Waldén, 1983 (junior homonym of Petrarca Fowler, 1899 [Cirripedia]; Lauria (Senilauria) Pilsbry, 1928 is a replacement name)
- Reinhardtia O. Boettger, 1878: synonym of Lauria Gray, 1840
