= List of Macaronesian species extinct in the Holocene =

Location of Macaronesia in the North Atlantic Ocean.

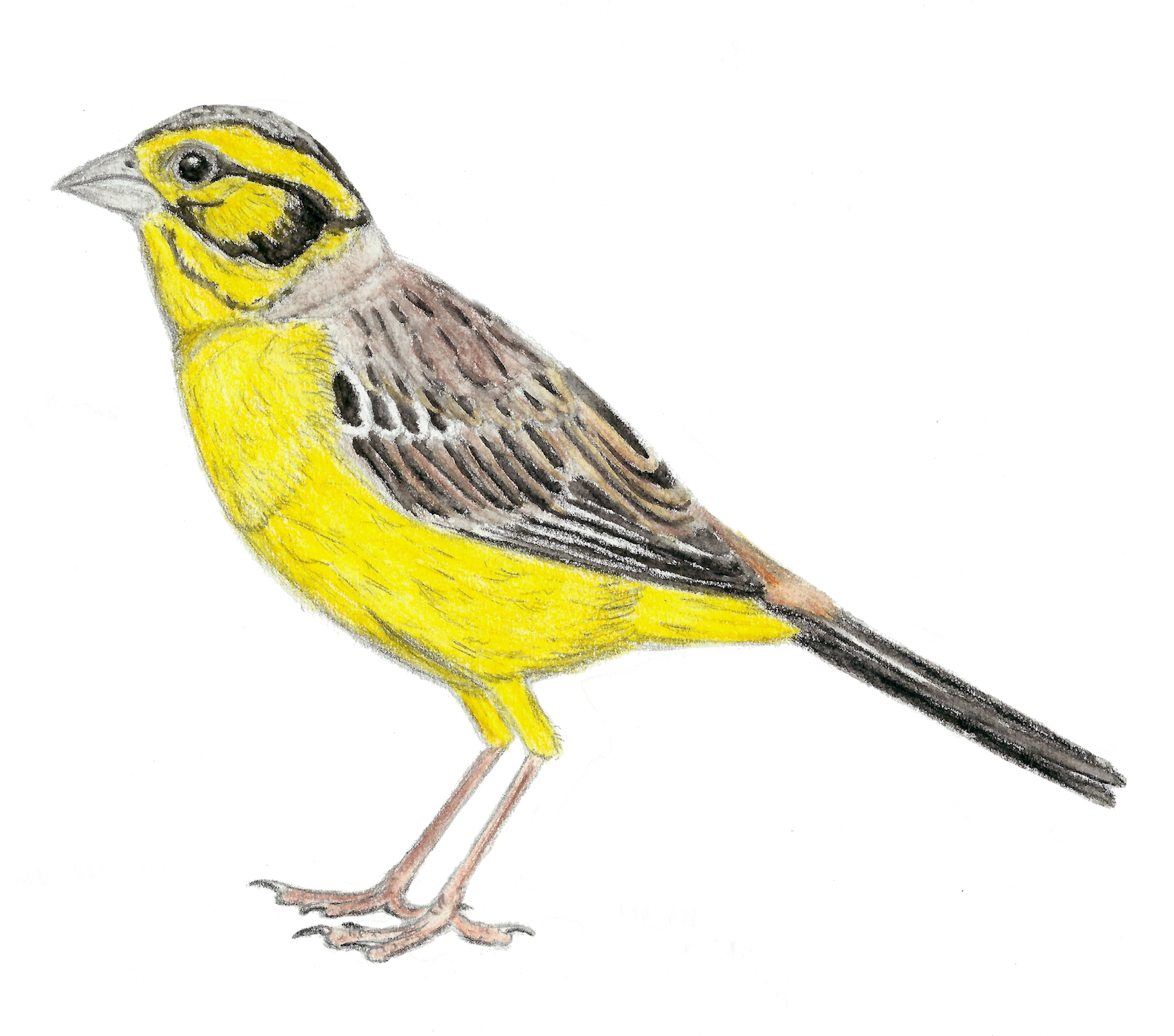
The long-legged bunting (Emberiza alcoveri) disappeared after the human settlement of the Canary Islands. Along with several New Zealand wrens, it is a rare example of a flightless passerine.

This is a list of Macaronesian species extinct in the Holocene that covers extinctions from the Holocene epoch, a geologic epoch that began about 11,650 years before present (about 9700 BCE) (Note: The source gives "11,700 calendar yr b2k (before CE 2000)". But "BP" means "before CE 1950". Therefore, the Holocene began 11,650 BP. Doing the math, that is c. 9700 BCE.) and continues to the present day.

Macaronesia is a collection of four volcanic archipelagos in the North Atlantic, off the coast of Africa. Macaronesia consists of the Azores (part of Portugal), Maderia (part of Portugal), the Canary Islands (part of Spain), and Cape Verde (an independent country).

Numerous species have disappeared from the Macaronesian islands as part of the ongoing Holocene extinction, driven by human activity.

== Mammals (class Mammalia) ==
=== Rodents (order Rodentia) ===
==== Old World rats and mice (family Muridae) ====
Common name	Scientific name	Range	Comments	Pictures
Tenerife giant rat	Canariomys bravoi	Tenerife, Canary Islands	Remains from La Fuente cave were originally dated to the 12th or 13th century, implying a long coexistence of the species with humans. However this datation was indirect as it was measured on charcoal and wood found near C. bravoi remains, rather than on the remains themselves. Studies performed on the latter establish the most recent survival of C. bravoi at 400-231 BCE and a quick extinction after human colonization. Though hunting cannot be excluded, the introduction of goats, sheep, pigs, and house mice likely had a greater role in its extinction by causing habitat alteration or predating on the rats themselves.	
Gran Canaria giant rat	Canariomys tamarani	Gran Canaria, Canary Islands	Most recent remains at La Aldea de San Nicolás de Tolentino dated to 130 BCE. The extinction process of this species is poorly understood though hunting by humans and feral dogs have been proposed as causes.	
Lava mouse	Malpaisomys insularis	Lanzarote and Fuerteventura, Canary Islands	Most recent remains at Cueva del Llano dated to 1270-1395. The species survived the first human colonization of the islands and the introduction of the house mouse, but became extinct shortly after the introduction of the black rat (before 650 CE in Lanzarote and after the 13th century in Fuerteventura).	

=== Carnivorans (order Carnivora) ===
==== Earless seals (family Phocidae) ====
===== Locally extinct =====
Common name	Scientific name	Range	Comments	Pictures
Mediterranean monk seal	Monachus monachus	Macaronesia to the Cantabrian and Mediterranean Seas	Breeding colonies likely existed in all Macaronesian archipelagos before the 17th century. Commercial exploitation by Europeans began in the Late Middle Ages, and currently only one colony in the Desertas Islands of Madeira survives, using deep caves to rear their young instead of beaches as it was common historically. This colony and the one in Ras Nouadhibou are the sources of vagrants sometimes seen near the Azores and Canary Islands. The last breeding colony in the Canary Islands disappeared in the first half of the 20th century.	

== Birds (class Aves) ==
=== Landfowl (order Galliformes) ===
==== Pheasants and allies (family Phasianidae) ====
Common name	Scientific name	Range	Comments	Pictures
Canary Islands quail	Coturnix gomerae	Canary Islands	Disappeared shortly after human settlement, probably due to predation by cats or rats.	
Porto Santo quail	Coturnix alabrevis	Porto Santo Island, Madeira	Known from Late Quaternary remains. The Azorean and Madeiran species of this genus are presumed to have become extinct as a result of human activity, but the timeframe is unclear. They could have been wiped out by house mice introduced by Viking visitors way before Portuguese settlement began in the 14th and 15th centuries.	
Cape Verde quail	Coturnix centensis	São Vicente, Cape Verde	Known from remains dated to 1015-1155.	
Madeiran quail	Coturnix lignorum	Madeira	Known from remains dated to 1021-806 BCE.	

=== Pigeons and doves (order Columbiformes) ===
==== Pigeons and doves (family Columbidae) ====
Common name	Scientific name	Range	Comments	Pictures
Madeiran wood pigeon	Columba palumbus maderensis	Madeira	Last recorded in 1904. The causes of extinction are unknown.	

=== Rails and cranes (order Gruiformes) ===
==== Rails (family Rallidae) ====
Common name	Scientific name	Range	Comments	Pictures
Porto Santo rail	Rallus adolfocaesaris	Porto Santo Island, Madeira	Flightless descendants of the water rail, known from subfossil remains, that probably disappeared after the arrival of humans and the introduction of invasive species to the islands.	
São Miguel rail	Rallus carvaoensis	São Miguel Island, Azores	Flightless descendants of the water rail, known from subfossil remains, that probably disappeared after the arrival of humans and the introduction of invasive species to the islands.	
Madeira rail	Rallus lowei	Madeira	Flightless descendants of the water rail, known from subfossil remains, that probably disappeared after the arrival of humans and the introduction of invasive species to the islands.	
Pico rail	Rallus montivagorum	Pico Island, Azores	Unlike other extinct Macaronesian rails, this species could still fly. Carbon 14 dating shows that it survived until Portuguese colonization in the first half of the 15th century.	
São Jorge rail	Rallus nanus	São Jorge Island, Azores	Flightless, probably disappeared after the arrival of humans and the introduction of invasive species to the islands.	
Graciosa rail	Rallus sp.	Graciosa, Azores	Likely disappeared after the arrival of humans and the introduction of invasive species to the islands.	
Terceira rail	Rallus sp.	Terceira, Azores	Likely disappeared after the arrival of humans and the introduction of invasive species to the islands.	
Santa Maria rail	Rallus sp.	Santa Maria Island, Azores	Likely disappeared after the arrival of humans and the introduction of invasive species to the islands.	

=== Shorebirds (order Charadriiformes) ===
==== Oystercatchers (family Haematopodidae) ====
Common name	Scientific name	Range	Comments	Pictures
Canary Islands oystercatcher	Haematopus meadewaldoi	bred in Lanzarote and Fuerteventura, Canary Islands; visitor to Tenerife and the Senegalese coast	Last collected in Lanzarote and Fuerteventura in 1913 and reported extinct there by 1940, but also reported twice in Tenerife between 1968 and 1981. Its decline was probably a result of overharvesting of intertidal invertebrates (most notably Patella candei, extirpated from all islands bar Fuerteventura) and disturbance by people, although predation by rats and cats has also been implicated.	

==== Sandpipers (family Scolopacidae) ====
Common name	Scientific name	Range	Comments	Pictures
Slender-billed curlew	Numenius tenuirostris	North Africa and Western Eurasia	Historically documented as accidental in the Azores and Canary Islands, but not recorded worldwide since 2001.	

==== Auks (family Alcidae) ====
Common name	Scientific name	Range	Comments	Pictures
Great auk	Pinguinus impennis	Northern Atlantic and western Mediterranean	A sternum found in Madeira is the southernmost record of this species in the eastern Atlantic. The species became extinct globally in 1852.	

=== Albatrosses and petrels (order Procellariiformes) ===
==== Petrels and shearwaters (family Procellariidae) ====
Common name	Scientific name	Range	Comments	Pictures
Azorean little gadfly petrel	Pterodroma zinorum	Azores archipelago	Most recent remains dated to 1104-1672 CE, overlapping with early Portuguese colonisation of the archipelago. It probably became extinct as a result of human activity and introduced mammals.	
Canary Islands petrel	Pterodroma sp.	El Hierro, Canary Islands	Possibly an extirpated population of an extant species.	
Dune shearwater	Puffinus holeae	Canary Islands to Portuguese coast	Most recent remain at Lobos islet dated to 1159-790 BCE. It bred in easily accessible beach dunes and likely became extinct due to hunting or predation by introduced house mice soon after human arrival.	
Lava shearwater	Puffinus olsoni	Fuerteventura, Canary Islands	Most recent remains dated to 1270-1475 CE. The species likely declined due to hunting and predation by introduced house mice before being finished by cats and black rats.	

=== Hawks and relatives (order Accipitriformes) ===
==== Hawks, eagles, kites, harriers and Old World vultures (family Accipitridae) ====
===== Locally extinct =====
Common name	Scientific name	Range	Comments	Pictures
Eurasian goshawk	Accipiter gentilis	Palearctic realm	Formerly present in the Canary Islands. It probably disappeared after the decline or extinction of its prey due to human hunting and introduced mammals.	
Common buzzard	Buteo buteo	Macaronesia, western Eurasia, and parts of Africa and India	Disappeared from Madeira in historical times as a result of deforestation, but returned after forests recovered.	
Red kite	Milvus milvus	Europe and the Mediterranean region	Extirpated from Cape Verde and possibly the Canary Islands.	

=== Owls (order Strigiformes) ===
==== True owls (family Strigidae) ====
Common name	Scientific name	Range	Comments	Pictures
São Miguel scops owl	Otus frutuosoi	São Miguel Island, Azores	Known from remains dated to 49 BCE - 125 CE. Though smaller that O. mauli, it was also a weak flyer and likely nested on the ground, making it vulnerable to introduced predators.	
Madeiran scops owl	Otus mauli	Madeira	Known from undated, but likely recent Holocene bones. It had considerably longer legs than the Eurasian scops owl, hinting that it was more terrestrial and hunted on the ground of the local laurel forests. As such, it would have been vulnerable to the fires set by the first Portuguese colonizers to clear the islands for agriculture, and to the predation of black rats introduced by them.	

=== Perching birds (order Passeriformes) ===
==== Buntings (family Emberizidae) ====
Common name	Scientific name	Range	Comments	Pictures
Long-legged bunting	Emberiza alcoveri	Tenerife, Canary Islands	Known from subfossil remains. The date of extinction is unknown, but its flightlessness, limb proportions, and bill musculature indicate that it was a ground bird that fed on hard seeds in the herb-rich understorey of laurel forests. As such, it was vulnerable to human-induced habitat destruction and introduced mammalian predators.	

==== True finches (family Fringillidae) ====
Common name	Scientific name	Range	Comments	Pictures
	Acanthis? sp.	Madeira	An undescribed species of thick-billed finch belonging to this genus or related to it, known from Quaternary remains.	
Slender-billed greenfinch	Chloris aurelioi	Tenerife, Canary Islands	Only remains dated to 11477-11257 BCE, but presumed to have survived until human arrival. It had limited flying ability, making it vulnerable to introduced predators.	
Trias greenfinch	Chloris triasi	La Palma, Canary Islands	Had limited flying ability, making it vulnerable to introduced predators.	
Madeira finch	Goniaphea leucocephala	Madeira	Only known from a 1823 description and sketch, based on a specimen that was probably lost while en route to Europe.	
Greater Azores bullfinch	Pyrrhula crassa	Graciosa Island, Azores	Described from remains dated to 1400-1190 BCE.	(right, compared to the extant Azores bullfinch)

===== Locally extinct =====
Common name	Scientific name	Range	Comments	Pictures
Hawfinch	Coccothraustes coccothraustes	Mid-latitude Eurasia and North Africa	Currently an accidental species in Madeira, but subfossil remains suggest it resided in the archipelago once.	

==== Leaf warblers (family Phylloscopidae) ====
Common name	Scientific name	Range	Comments
Eastern Canary Islands chiffchaff	Phylloscopus canariensis exsul	Lanzarote and possibly Fuerteventura, Canary Islands	Last recorded in 1986 in its only documented location, the Haría Valley of Lanzarote. Its presence in Fuerteventura is uncertain, but possible given the existence of the western Canary Islands chiffchaff subspecies in all other islands.

==== Thrushes (family Turdidae) ====
Scientific name	Range	Comments
Turdus sp.	Madeira	A large species known from abundant Quaternary remains, with greatly lengthened hind limbs, that is clearly distinct from the common blackbird currently present in the islands.

== Reptiles (class Reptilia) ==
=== Squamates (order Squamata) ===
==== Wall lizards (family Lacertidae) ====
Common name	Scientific name	Range	Comments	Pictures
Tenerife giant lizard	Gallotia goliath	Tenerife, Canary Islands	Mentioned by the earliest European sources in the 15th century. Archaeological evidence shows that it was consumed by the pre-Hispanic population and that it gradually declined over time.	
Roque Chico de Salmor giant lizard	Gallotia simonyi simonyi	Roque Chico de Salmor off of El Hierro, Canary Islands	Discovered in 1889, it was hunted and captured for museums and exhibition until the two last known individuals were collected in 1931.	

===== Possibly extinct =====
Common name	Scientific name	Range	Comments
La Palma giant lizard	Gallotia auaritae	La Palma, Canary Islands	Described from subfossil remains. However sightings and photographs of a large Gallotia lizard that could be this species were made in the northern part of the island around 2007.

==== Skinks (family Scincidae) ====
Common name	Scientific name	Range	Comments	Pictures
Cape Verde giant skink	Chioninia coctei	the Cape Verde islands of São Vicente, Santa Luzia, Branco, and Raso; possibly São Nicolau	Declined in São Vicente and Santa Luzia from the late 17th century, though some animals were captured there in the late 19th and early 20th century. Following its rediscovery in Branco in 1873, the species became a highly sought curiosity for European museums and collectionists, who removed hundreds of animals until the island was depleted in 1902. The last wild population in Raso disappeared after fishermen released dogs on the island in 1915, and the last captive animal died in Europe in 1940. A claimed juvenile jaw was found in feral cat droppings from Santa Luzia in 2005, but a 2006 survey of the island found no animals.	

=== Turtles and tortoises (order Testudines) ===
==== Tortoises (family Testudinidae) ====
Common name	Scientific name	Range	Comments
Calhâu small tortoise	Centrochelys sp.	São Vicente, Cape Verde	Present before human settlement.

== Insects (class Insecta) ==
=== Butterflies and moths (order Lepidoptera) ===
==== Whites or yellow-whites (family Pieridae) ====
===== Possibly extinct =====
Common name	Scientific name	Range	Comments	Pictures
Madeiran large white	Pieris brassicae wollastoni	Madeira	Last reported in the 1970s. Causes of decline are unknown, but introduced diseases and the parasitoid wasp Cotesia glomerata have been suggested.	

== Slugs and snails (class Gastropoda) ==
=== Order Stylommatophora ===
==== Family Discidae ====
===== Possibly extinct =====
Scientific name	Range	Comments	Pictures
Canaridiscus engonatus	Tenerife, Canary Islands	Not reported since originally described in 1852. The documented range has since been urbanized.	
Canaridiscus retextus	La Palma, Canary Islands	Not reported since originally described in 1852. The causes of decline are unknown, but deforestation has been suggested on the basis of similar species being forest specialists.	

==== Family Gastrodontidae ====
===== Possibly extinct =====
Scientific name	Range	Comments
Janulus pompylius	La Palma, Canary Islands	Last seen in 1865.

==== Family Geomitridae ====
Scientific name	Range	Comments
Caseolus calvus galeatus	Madeira	
Pseudocampylaea lowii	Porto Santo and Ilhéu de Baixo, Madeira	Not seen alive since the holotype was collected in 1878. Fossil shells are common in Quaternary deposits of the islands.

===== Possibly extinct, family Geomitridae =====
Scientific name	Range	Comments
Discula tetrica	Desertas Islands, Madeira	Reported as "rare" in Bugio in the 1860s and not seen since 1878.
Geomitra delphinuloides	Eastern Madeira	Not seen alive since 1860.
Keraea garachicoensis	North Tenerife, Canary Islands	Last recorded in 1878.

==== Family Lauriidae ====
Scientific name	Range	Comments
Leiostyla lamellosa	Madeira	Last recorded in 1878.

===== Possibly extinct, family Lauriidae =====
Scientific name	Range	Comments
Leiostyla abbreviata	Madeira	Last recorded in 1878. The exact geographic origin of the holotype is in doubt.
Leiostyla gibba	Madeira	Described from two dead shells in 1878. Remains are common in late Holocene deposits c. 350-1750 CE, though only one is known from after settlement.

== Plants (kingdom Plantae) ==
=== Flowering plants (clade Angiospermae) ===
==== Mistletoes and sandalwoods (family Santalaceae) ====
===== Possibly extinct =====
Common name	Scientific name	Range	Comments
Escobilla de masca	Thesium psilotocladum	Barranco de Masca, Tenerife	Last recorded in 1983. Likely extinct due to predation by introduced goats and rabbits.
