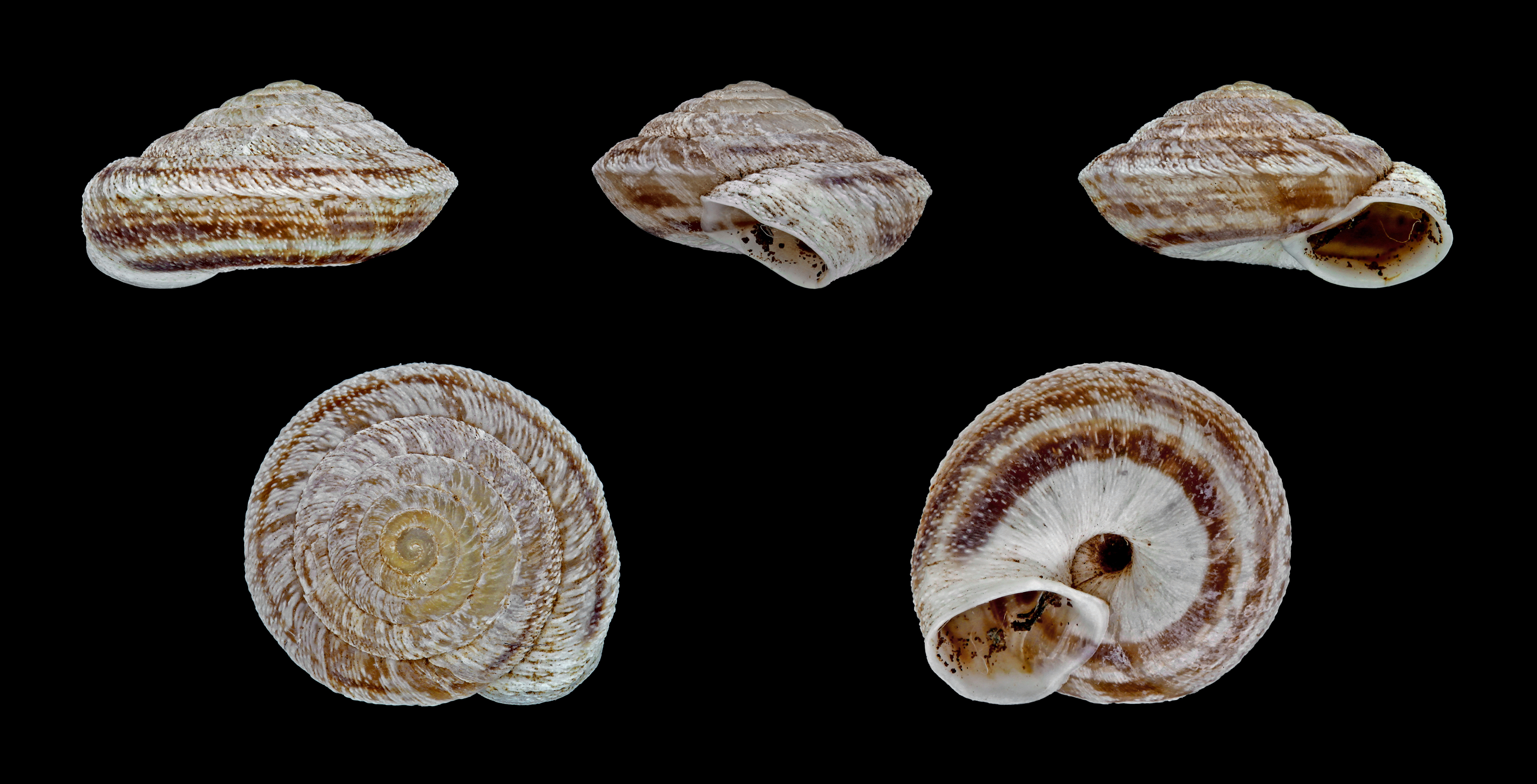
- Discula polymorpha shell

Scientific classification
- Kingdom: Animalia
- Phylum: Mollusca
- Class: Gastropoda
- Order: Stylommatophora
- Family: Geomitridae
- Genus: Discula; R. T. Lowe, 1852

Synonyms
- Discula (Discula) R. T. Lowe, 1852 alternative representation; Discula (Mandahlia) Forcart, 1965 alternative representation; Helix (Discula) R. T. Lowe, 1852 (original rank); Helix (Tectula) R. T. Lowe, 1852 (junior subjective synonym); Ochthephila (Discula) R. T. Lowe, 1852 superseded rank; Ochthephila (Tectula) R. T. Lowe, 1852 (junior subjective synonym); Tectula R. T. Lowe, 1852 · unaccepted (junior subjective synonym); Turritella Wollaston, 1878

= Discula =

Genus of gastropods

Discula is a genus of small land snails, terrestrial pulmonate gastropod mollusks in the family Geomitridae.

== Shell description ==
The shell of these snails is shaped rather like a discus, or a lens, with a sharp edge around the periphery of the whorls.

== Species ==
Species in the genus Discula include:

- Discula attrita (R. T. Lowe, 1831)
- Discula calcigena (R. T. Lowe, 1831)
- Discula cameroni Pokryszko, Groh & Teixeira, 2019
- Discula cheiranthicola (R. T. Lowe, 1831)
- † Discula cockerelli (Noronha, 1923)
- Discula discina (R. T. Lowe, 1852)
- Discula lyelliana (R. T. Lowe, 1852)
- Discula polymorpha (R. T. Lowe, 1831)
- Discula pulvinata (R. T. Lowe, 1831)
- Discula tabellata (R. T. Lowe, 1852)
- Discula tectiformis (G. B. Sowerby I, 1824)
- Discula tetrica (R. T. Lowe, 1862)

Synonyms

- Discula bicarinata is a synonym for Hystricella bicarinata (Sowerby, 1824)
- Discula bulverii (W. Wood, 1828): synonym of Callina bulverii (W. Wood, 1828) (superseded generic combination)
- Discula echinulata is a synonym for Hystricella echinulata
- Discula leacockiana( Wollaston, 1878): synonym of Wollastonaria leacockiana (Wollaston, 1878)
- Discula oxytropis is a synonym for Wollastonaria oxytropis
- Discula rotula (R.T. Lowe, 1831): synonym of Callina rotula (R. T. Lowe, 1831)
- Discula testudinalis is a synonym for Testudodiscula testudinalis
- Discula turricula is a synonym for Hystricella turricula (R. T. Lowe, 1831)

== Note ==
The name Discula is ambiguous and also refers to a genus of fungi in the family Valsaceae to which belongs the plant pathogen dogwood anthracnose Discula destructiva.
