= List of non-marine molluscs of Madeira =

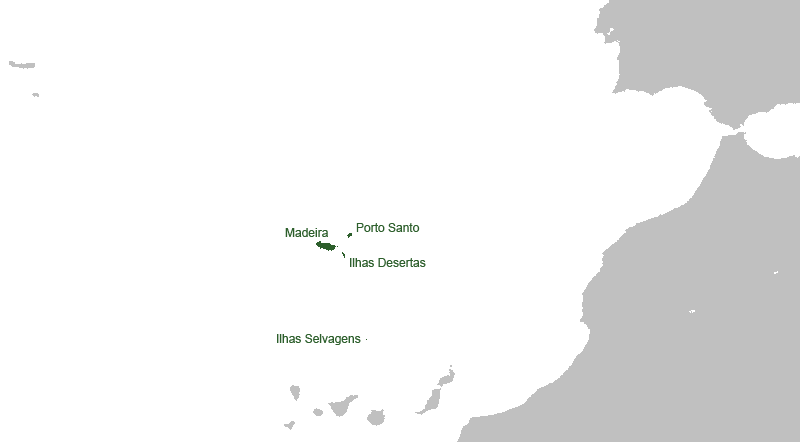
Location of Madeira

The non-marine molluscs of Madeira are a part of the molluscan fauna of Madeira (wildlife of Madeira). This list includes whole Madeira Autonomous Region, that includes Madeira Island, Porto Santo Island, Desertas Islands and Savage Islands.

A number of species of non-marine molluscs are found in the wild in Madeira.

There are 56 species of gastropods: ?? species of freshwater gastropods, 56 species of land gastropods (land snails) and ?? species of bivalves living in the wild.

The degree of endemism for the area of Madeira is about 84%.

Summary table of number of species

(Summary table is based on species counted in this list and include also those ones with question marks)

	Madeira
freshwater gastropods	??
land gastropods	56 species of land snails
gastropods altogether	56
bivalves	??
molluscs altogether	56
non-indigenous gastropods in the wild	?? freshwater and ?? land
non-indigenous hot-house alien gastropods	?
non-indigenous bivalves in the wild	?
non-indigenous hot-house alien bivalves	?
non-indigenous molluscs altogether	?

== Land gastropods ==
Discidae

- Discus guerinianus (R. T. Lowe, 1852) - endemic to Madeira

Ferussaciidae

- Amphorella iridescens
- Amphorella melampoides
- Amphorella hypselia
- Cecilioides eulima (Lowe, 1854)
- Cecilioides nyctelia
- Cylichnidia ovuliformis

Lauriidae

- Leiostyla abbreviata (R. T. Lowe, 1852) - globally extinct from Madeira
- Leiostyla gibba (R. T. Lowe, 1852) - globally extinct from Madeira
- Leiostyla lamellosa (R. T. Lowe, 1852) - globally extinct from Madeira

Hygromiidae

- Caseolus calvus galeatus (R. T. Lowe, 1862) - The subspecies Caseolus calvus galeatus is globally extinct.
- Caseolus commixtus R. T. Lowe, 1852
- Craspedaria coronula (R. T. Lowe, 1852)
- Discula bulweri (Wood, 1828)
- Discula cheiranthicola
- Discula lyelliana (R. T. Lowe, 1852) - globally extinct from Deserta Grande Island
- Discula rotula (R. T. Lowe, 1831) - on Porto Santo Island
- Discula tabellata (R. T. Lowe, 1852)
- Discula tetrica (R. T. Lowe, 1862) - globally extinct from Bugio
- Geomitra delphinuloides (R. T. Lowe, 1860) - globally extinct from Madeira
- Geomitra grabhami (Wollaston, 1878)
- Geomitra moniziana Paiva, 1867
- Geomitra tiarella Webb & Berthelot, 1833
- Hystricella bicarinata (Sowerby, 1824)
- Hystricella echinulata
- Hystricella oxytropis
- Hystricella turricula (R. T. Lowe, 1831)
- Pseudocampylaea loweii (A. Férussac, 1835) - globally extinct from Madeira
- Serratorotula coronata (Deshayes, 1850) - synonym: Geomitra coronata

Helicidae

- Leptaxis simia hyaena (R. T. Lowe, 1852) - The subspecies Leptaxis simia hyaena is globally extinct from Bugio, Madeira

== See also ==
- List of non-marine molluscs of Portugal

Lists of molluscs of surrounding countries:

- List of non-marine molluscs of the Canary Islands
