= List of islands of Portugal =

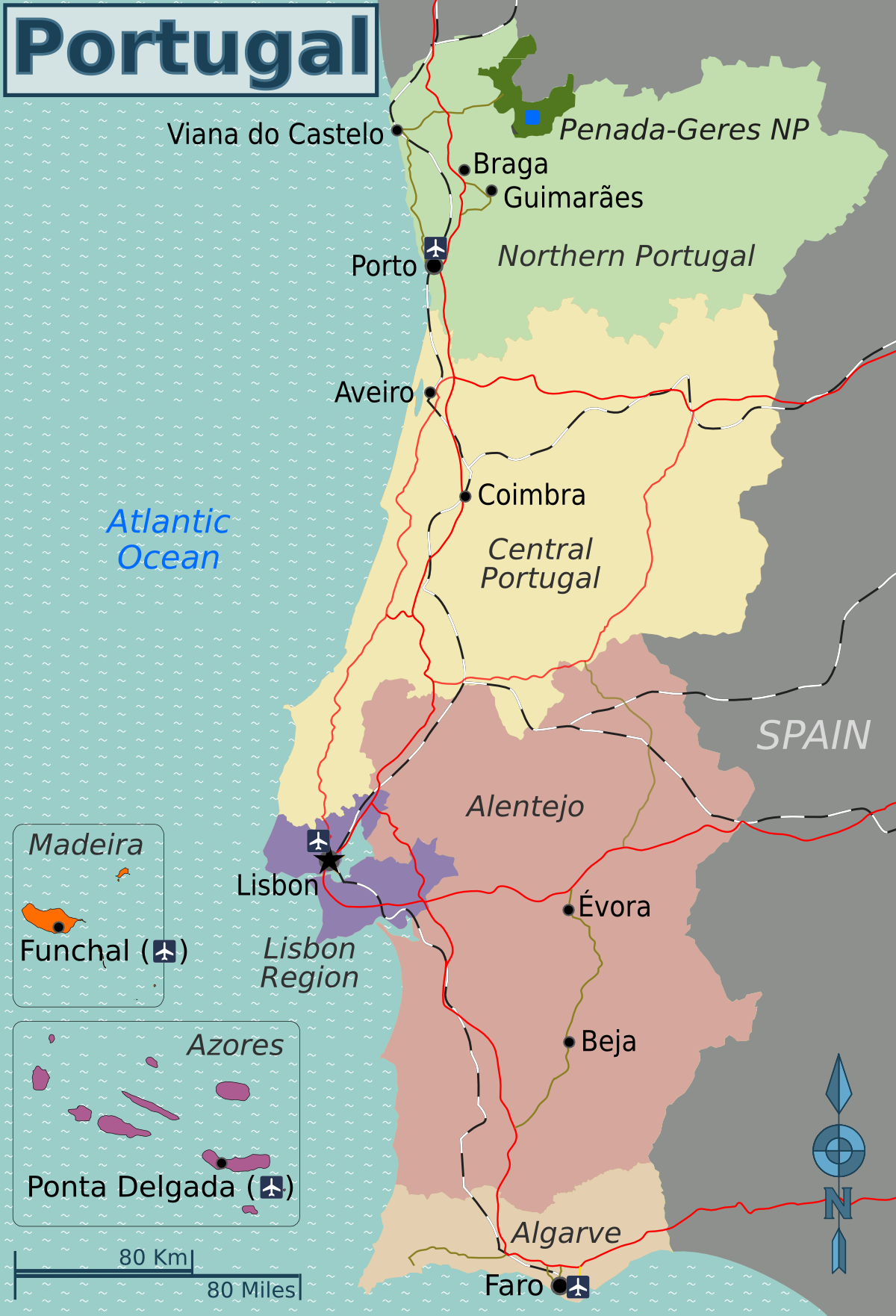
Regions of Portugal

This is a list of islands of Portugal, including islets (Portuguese: ilhéu or ilhote). The islands (Portuguese: Ilha) are listed by region.

== Continental Portugal ==
=== Algarve Region ===
Islands in the Algarve Region include:

- Ilha da Barreta, 36°58′00″N 7°54′00″W
- Ilha da Culatra, 36°59′20″N 7°50′01″W
- Ilha de Armona, 37°01′50″N 7°46′06″W
- Ilha de Cabanas, 37°07′28″N 7°36′37″W
- Ilha de Cacela, 37°09′07″N 7°32′46″W
- Ilha de Tavira, 37°04′43″N 7°40′35″W
- Ilhéu da Geada, 36°59′37″N 7°54′17″W
- Ilhéu da Margalha, 36°59′56″N 7°54′59″W
- Ilhéu das Alturas, 37°00′36″N 7°51′07″W
- Ilhéu do Alcorão, 37°00′18″N 7°51′00″W
- Ilhéu do Barro, 36°58′57″N 7°53′12″W
- Ilha do Coco, 37°01′07″N 7°49′50″W
- lhéu do Ramalhete 37°00′07″N 7°58′13″W
- Ilhéu dos Gemidos, 37°00′00″N 7°52′00″W
- Ilhéu Pedra das Gaivotas, 37°01′48″N 8°59′31″W
- Ilhote da Cobra, 36°59′00″N 7°57′00″W
- Ilhote da Cruz, 37°01′00″N 7°52′00″W
- Ilhote das Ratas, 36°59′00″N 7°56′00″W
- Ilhote do Pego, 37°01′00″N 7°52′00″W
- Ilhote dos Cavalos, 36°58′37″N 7°55′35″W
- Martinhal (Ilhotes do Martinhal), 37°00′56″N 8°55′02″W

=== Alentejo Region ===
The islands in the Alentejo Region include:

- Ariana
- Azenha Brava
- Bacelos
- Bacelos Pequena
- Cascalheira
- Freixial
- Juromenha
- Lebre
- Lezíria Internacional
- Perceveira
- Pessegueiro, 37°50′0.57″N 8°47′51.22″W
- Moinho
- Monte Branco
- Palmeira
- Palmeira Pequena
- Safra
- São Brás

=== Central Region ===
Islands in the Central Region include:

- A Nova
- Agolada
- Almourol, 39°27′43″N 8°23′06″W
- Amoroso
- Baleal, 39°22′23″N 9°20′20″W
- Bugio, 38°39′37″N 9°17′56″W
- Cambalhão
- Carmona
- Estrada
- Fora
- Gaga
- Gaivota
- Gramatal
- Idanha
- Lombo
- Marcehal
- Marinha Nova
- Matadouce
- Monte Farinha
- Morraceira
- Mo-do-Meio
- Ovos
- Parrachill
- Pedra
- Poço
- Rato
- Samos
- Testada
- Tranqueria
- Três Postes
- Turbina

Berlengas archipelago

In addition, the archipelago of the Berlengas includes one island and a two-islet group:

- Berlenga Grande, 39°29′56″N 9°31′24″W
- Estelas Islets, 39°27′N 9°32′W
- Farilhões-Forcados Islets (rocks), 39°28′32″N 9°32′55″W

=== North Region ===
The North Region includes the following islands:

- Amores, 41°55′18″N 8°46′15″W
- Boega, 41°55′38″N 8°45′47″W
- Ermal, 41°35′43″N 8°07′47″W
- Insua, 41°51′35″N 8°52′29″W

== Azores archipelago ==
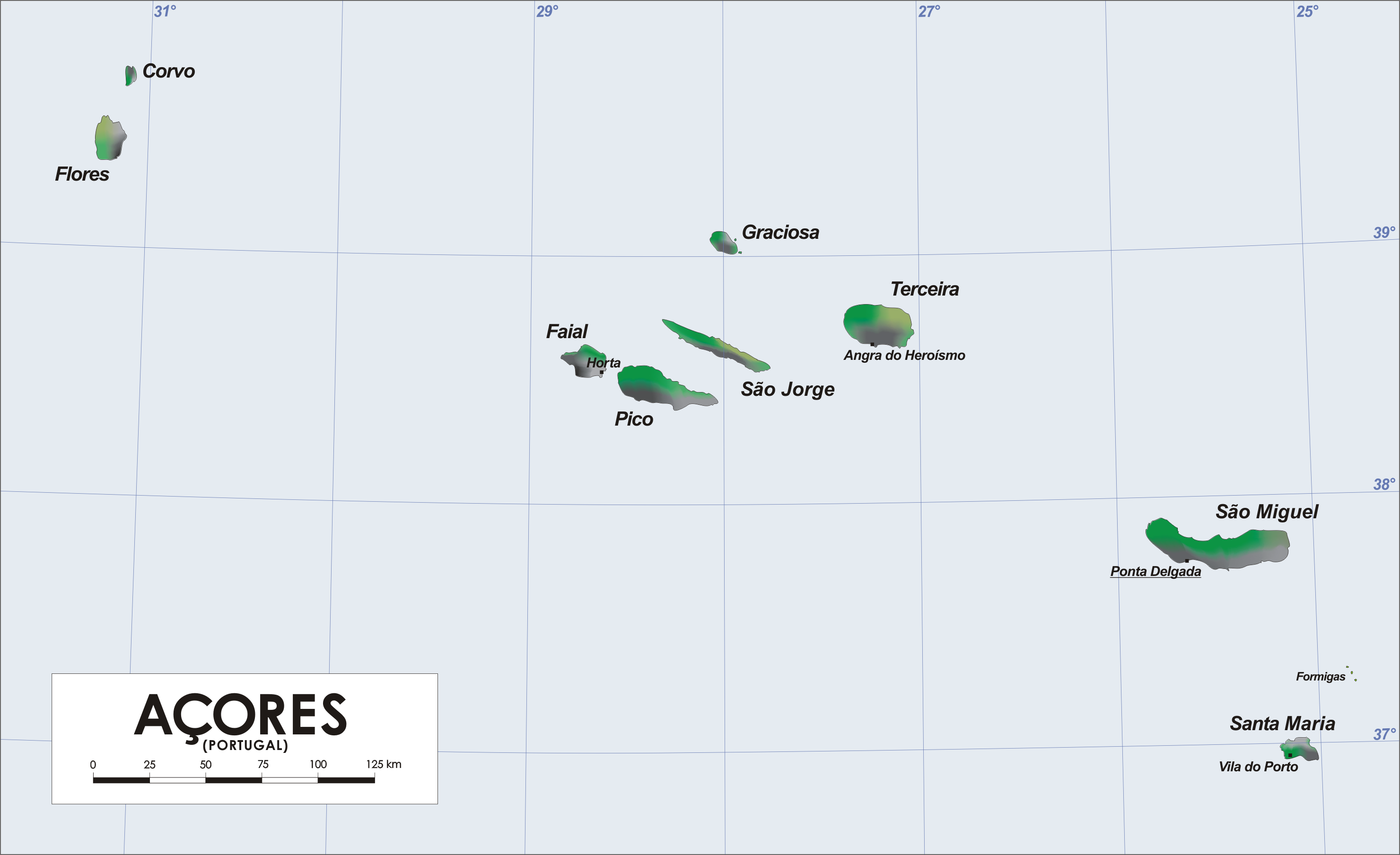
Map of the Azores

The archipelago of the Azores is politically organized as an autonomous region and includes nine islands and the Formigas islet group:

- Corvo, 39°42′6.75″N 31°6′6″W
- Faial, 38°34′57″N 28°42′17″W
- Flores, 39°26′37″N 31°11′57″W
- Graciosa, 39°3′5″N 28°0′51″W
- Pico, 38°27′57″N 28°20′0″W
- Santa Maria, 36°58′29″N 25°05′41″W
- São Jorge, 38°38′41″N 28°2′11″W
- São Miguel, 37°46′43″N 25°29′42″W
- Terceira, 38°43′40″N 27°12′48″W
- Formigas, 37°16′00″N 24°46′00″W

Read in detail, Here.

== Madeira Archipelago ==
Map of the Madeira archipelago

The archipelago of Madeira is politically organized as an autonomous region and includes two principal islands and two minor island groups:

- Madeira, 32°39′4″N 16°54′35″W
- Porto Santo, 33°03′43.0″N 16°21′23.0″W
- Desertas
  - Deserta Grande, 32°31′11″N 16°30′27″W
  - Bugio, 32°25′35″N 16°29′10″W
  - Chão Islet, 32°35′05″N 16°32′40″W
- Selvagens
  - Selvagem Grande, 30°08′51″N 15°51′54″W
  - Selvagem Pequena, 30°02′03″N 16°01′37″W
  - Palheiro da Terra Islet, 30°09′38″N 15°52′33″W
  - Palheiro do Mar Islet, 30°09′25″N 15°53′09″W
  - Fora Islet, 30°02′N 16°03′W
  - Alto Islet
  - Comprido Islet, 30°02′50″N 16°03′01″W
  - Redondo Islet
  - Norte Islets

== See also ==
- Exclusive economic zone of Portugal
- List of islands of São Tomé and Príncipe and List of islands of Cape Verde (discovered by Portuguese explorers)
