= Atlantica calathoides =

Conservation status
- Critically Endangered (IUCN 3.1)

Scientific classification
- Domain: Eukaryota
- Kingdom: Animalia
- Phylum: Mollusca
- Class: Gastropoda
- Order: Stylommatophora
- Family: Gastrodontidae
- Genus: Atlantica
- Species: A. calathoides

Binomial name
- Atlantica calathoides (R. T. Lowe, 1863)

Synonyms
- Discus guerinianus calathoides (Lowe, 1863); Helix calathoides (R.T. Lowe, 1863); Helix calathoides (Paiva, 1867); Patula calathoides (R.T. Lowe, 1863)

Species of molluscs

Atlantica calathoides is a species of land snail belonging to the family Gastrodontidae.

== Distribution ==
This species is endemic to Madeira, Portugal.

== Description ==
(Original description) This species is very closely allied to the Madeiran Atlantica gueriniana (R. T. Lowe, 1852), but is assuredly a genuine species, and not a merely large fossil form of that shell. It is distinguished by its larger size, less discoidal shape, greater convexity beneath, more elevated spire, obsolete keel, deeply impressed suture, and much coarser, more abrupt, and prominent ribs above, resembling, in the latter respect and in the abrupt ending of the ribs at the obsolete keel or angle of the last whorl, Janulus calathus (R. T. Lowe, 1852) (taxon inquirendum) or Janulus bifrons (R. T. Lowe, 1852).

== Historical account ==
The species was first described by Richard Thomas Lowe in 1863 as Helix calathoides.

In 2008, reserve warden Isamberto Silva and biologist Dinarte Teixeira rediscovered living populations of Atlantica calathoides on the island Deserta Grande. Specimens have since been found on two sites on Deserta Grande Island and Quaternary fossils have been found on the island Bugio.

== Ecology ==
=== Habitat ===
Atlantica calathoides are found in deep ravines on Deserta Grande Island. They can typically be seen at the base of common bracken or found underneath rocks.

== Threats ==
The main cause of population decline is predation by mice and ground beetles. Habitat degradation from goat grazing, droughts and landslides has also threatened the species.

== Conservation ==
Atlantica calathoides were one of the target species of the LIFE Recover Natura Project which ran from October 2013 to March 2019. It carried out a population study, monitoring scheme and species ecology study. During the project, new populations of Atlantica calathoides were identified and the species' conservation status was evaluated. Artificial shelters to assist in conservation were considered but it was concluded that this would not assist in conservation due to Atlantica calathoides spending extended periods of time underground.

In recent decades, there has been a continued control programme for goat populations which should assist with habitat restoration. Authorities in the area introduced the programme in the 1990s and have also eradicated other introduced species such as rabbits.
