= Geomitra =

Scientific classification
- Kingdom: Animalia
- Phylum: Mollusca
- Class: Gastropoda
- Order: Stylommatophora
- Family: Geomitridae
- Genus: Geomitra; Swainson, 1840

Genus of gastropods

Geomitra is a genus of air-breathing land snails, terrestrial pulmonate gastropod mollusks in the family Geomitridae.

== Species ==
Species within the genus Geomitra include:

- Geomitra delphinuloides (R.T. Lowe, 1860)
- Geomitra grabhami (Wollaston, 1878)
- Geomitra moniziana (Paiva, 1867) - Madeiran land snail
- Geomitra tiarella (Webb & Berthelot, 1833)
- Geomitra coronula (R.T. Lowe, 1852)
- Geomitra watsoni (J.Y. Johnson, 1897)

synonyms:

- Geomitra coronata (Deshayes, 1850) is a synonym for Serratorotula coronata (Deshayes, 1850)
