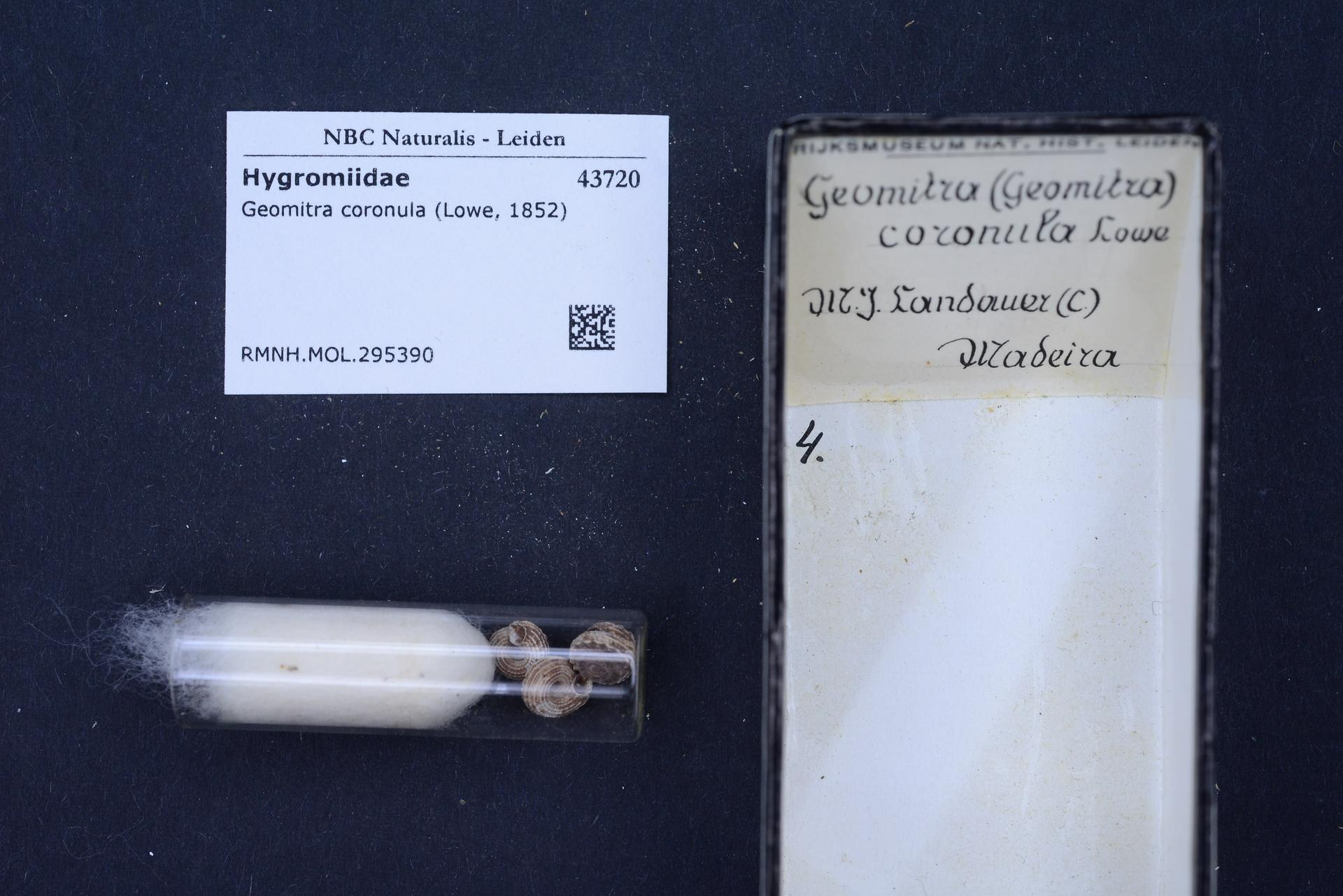

Conservation status
- Critically Endangered (IUCN 3.1)

Scientific classification
- Kingdom: Animalia
- Phylum: Mollusca
- Class: Gastropoda
- Order: Stylommatophora
- Family: Geomitridae
- Genus: Geomitra
- Species: G. coronula

Binomial name
- Geomitra coronula (Lowe, 1852)

Synonyms
- Craspedaria (Coronaria) coronula (R. T. Lowe, 1852) (alternate representation); Craspedaria coronula (R. T. Lowe, 1852) (superseded combination); Helix coronula R. T. Lowe, 1852 (original combination)

= Geomitra coronula =

Critically endangered species of gastropod

Geomitra coronula is a species of air-breathing land snail in the family Geomitridae.

== Distribution ==
Geomitra coronula is endemic to the Madeira Archipelago, where it is only found on the Desertas Islands. It was originally described by English malacologist Richard Thomas Lowe in 1852, from Quaternary fossil deposits found in the southern part of Bugio Island.

== Description ==
It has a conical white shell, 5–6 mm (0.20–0.24 in) in width and 3.5–4.5 mm (0.14–0.18 in) in length, with five whorls.
