= Leptaxis simia =

Conservation status
- Least Concern (IUCN 3.1)

Scientific classification
- Kingdom: Animalia
- Phylum: Mollusca
- Class: Gastropoda
- Order: Stylommatophora
- Family: Hygromiidae
- Genus: Leptaxis
- Species: L. simia

Binomial name
- Leptaxis simia (A. Férussac, 1832)

Species of gastropod

Leptaxis simia is a species of small air-breathing land snail, a terrestrial pulmonate gastropod mollusc in the family Helicidae.

== Subspecies ==
- Leptaxis simia simia
- Leptaxis simia hyaena (R. T. Lowe, 1852)

The subspecies Leptaxis simia hyaena (R. T. Lowe, 1852) endemic to Bugio, Madeira is globally extinct.

== Distribution ==
This species of land snail lives in Madeira, Portugal.
