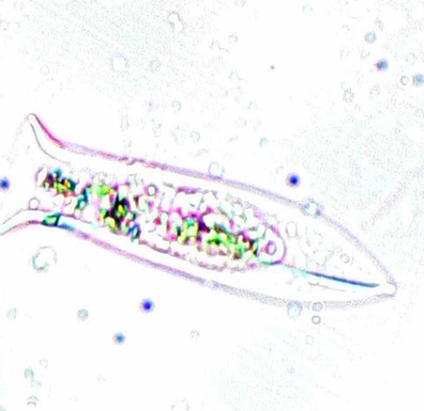

Scientific classification
- Kingdom: Animalia
- Phylum: Mollusca
- Class: Gastropoda
- Order: Stylommatophora
- Family: Ferussaciidae
- Genus: Amphorella; R. T. Lowe, 1852

Species
- Amphorella cimensis; Amphorella hypselia; Amphorella iridescens; Amphorella melampoides; † Amphorella talaverai

= Amphorella =

Genus of gastropods

Amphorella is a genus of air-breathing land snails, terrestrial pulmonate gastropod molluscs in the family Ferussaciidae.

== Species ==
The genus Amphorella contains the following species:

- Amphorella cimensis
- Amphorella hypselia
- Amphorella iridescens
- Amphorella melampoides
- † Amphorella talaverai Hutterer & Groh, 2014
