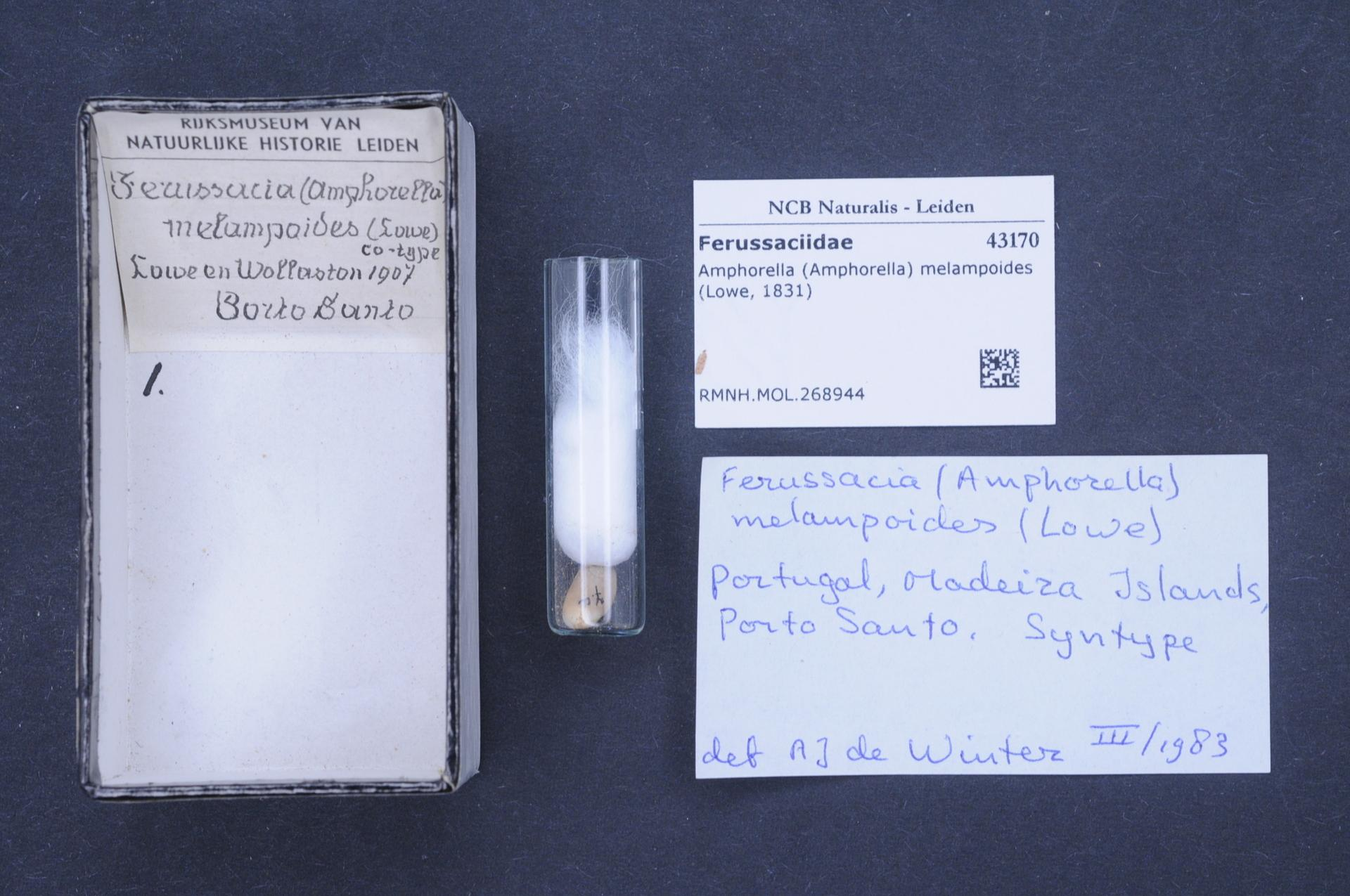

Conservation status
- Least Concern (IUCN 3.1)

Scientific classification
- Kingdom: Animalia
- Phylum: Mollusca
- Class: Gastropoda
- Order: Stylommatophora
- Family: Ferussaciidae
- Genus: Amphorella
- Species: A. melampoides

Binomial name
- Amphorella melampoides (R. T. Lowe, 1831)

= Amphorella melampoides =

Species of gastropod

Amphorella melampoides is a species of air-breathing land snail, a terrestrial pulmonate gastropod mollusk in the family Ferussaciidae.

This species is endemic to Madeira, Portugal.
