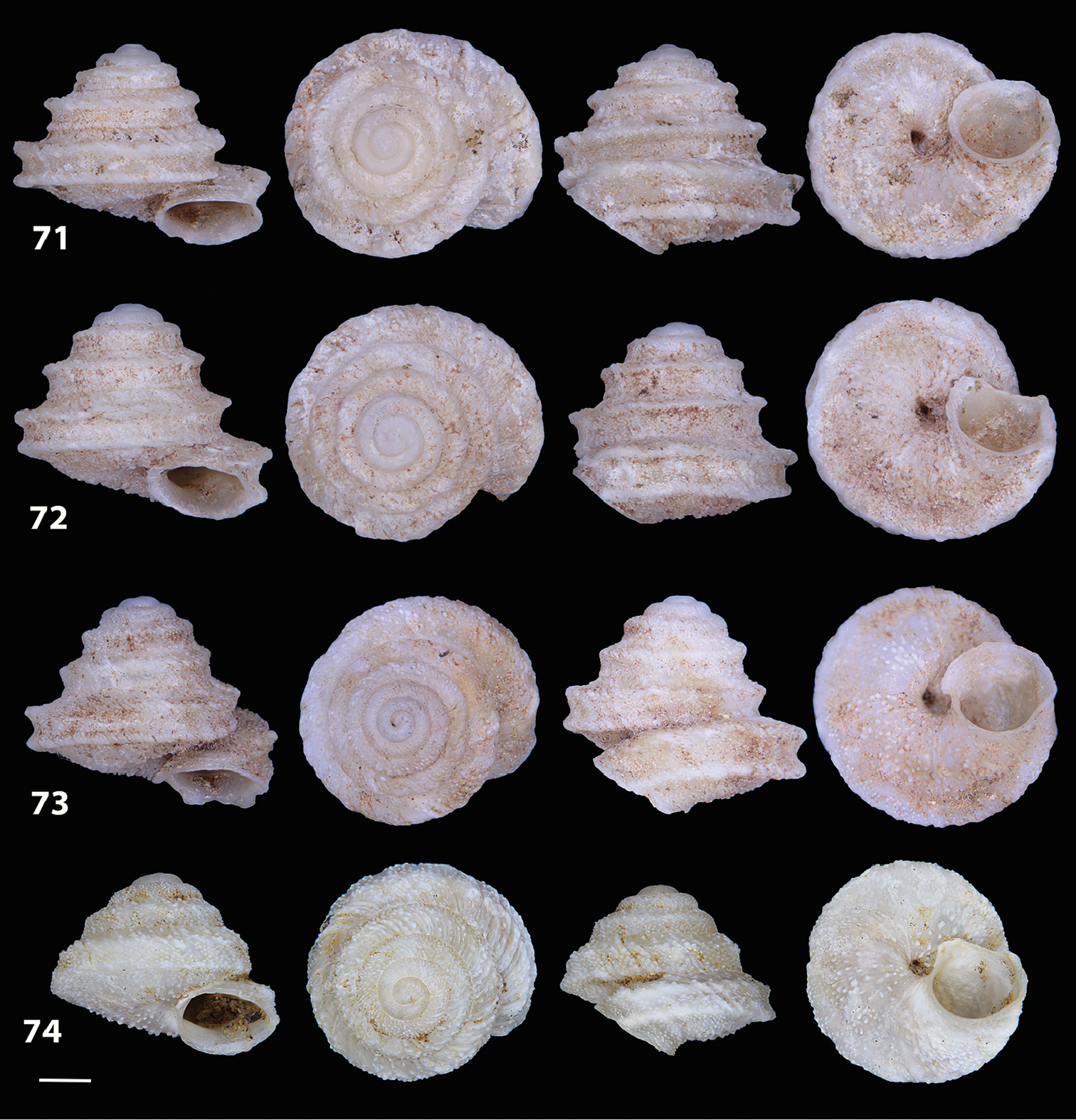
- Shells of Hystricella aucta

Scientific classification
- Kingdom: Animalia
- Phylum: Arthropoda
- Clade: Pancrustacea
- Class: Insecta
- Order: Lepidoptera
- Superfamily: Geometroidea
- Family: Geometridae
- Subfamily: Geometrinae
- Genus: Hystricella; R.T. Lowe, 1855

Synonyms
- Helix (Hystricella) R. T. Lowe, 1855 · unaccepted (original rank)

= Hystricella =

Genus of gastropods

Hystricella is a genus of air-breathing land snails, terrestrial pulmonate gastropod mollusks in the subfamily Geomitrinae of the family Geomitridae, the hairy snails and their allies.

== Species ==
Species within the genus Hystricella include:

- † Hystricella aucta (Wollaston, 1878)
- Hystricella bicarinata (G. B. Sowerby I, 1824)
- † Hystricella echinoderma (Wollaston, 1878)
- Hystricella echinulata (R. T. Lowe, 1831)
- † Hystricella microcarinata De Mattia & Groh, 2018

Synonyms

- Hystricella leacockiana (Wollaston, 1878): synonym of Wollastonaria leacockiana (Wollaston, 1878) (superseded generic combination)
- Hystricella oxytropis (R. T. Lowe, 1831): synonym of Wollastonaria oxytropis (R. T. Lowe, 1831) (superseded generic combination)
- Hystricella turricula (R. T. Lowe, 1831): synonym of Wollastonaria turricula (R. T. Lowe, 1831) (superseded generic combination)
