= Callina =

Scientific classification
- Kingdom: Animalia
- Phylum: Mollusca
- Class: Gastropoda
- Order: Stylommatophora
- Family: Geomitridae
- Genus: Callina; R. T. Lowe, 1852

Synonyms
- Discula (Callina) R. T. Lowe, 1855 ·(superseded generic combination); Helix (Callina) R. T. Lowe, 1855 (original rank); Ochthephila (Callina) R. T. Lowe, 1855

Genus of gastropods

Callina is a genus of small land snails, terrestrial pulmonate gastropod mollusks in the family Geomitridae.

== Species ==
Species in the genus Callina include:

- Callina bulverii (W. Wood, 1828)
- Callina rotula (R. T. Lowe, 1831)
- † Callina waldeni Groh & De Mattia, 2018
