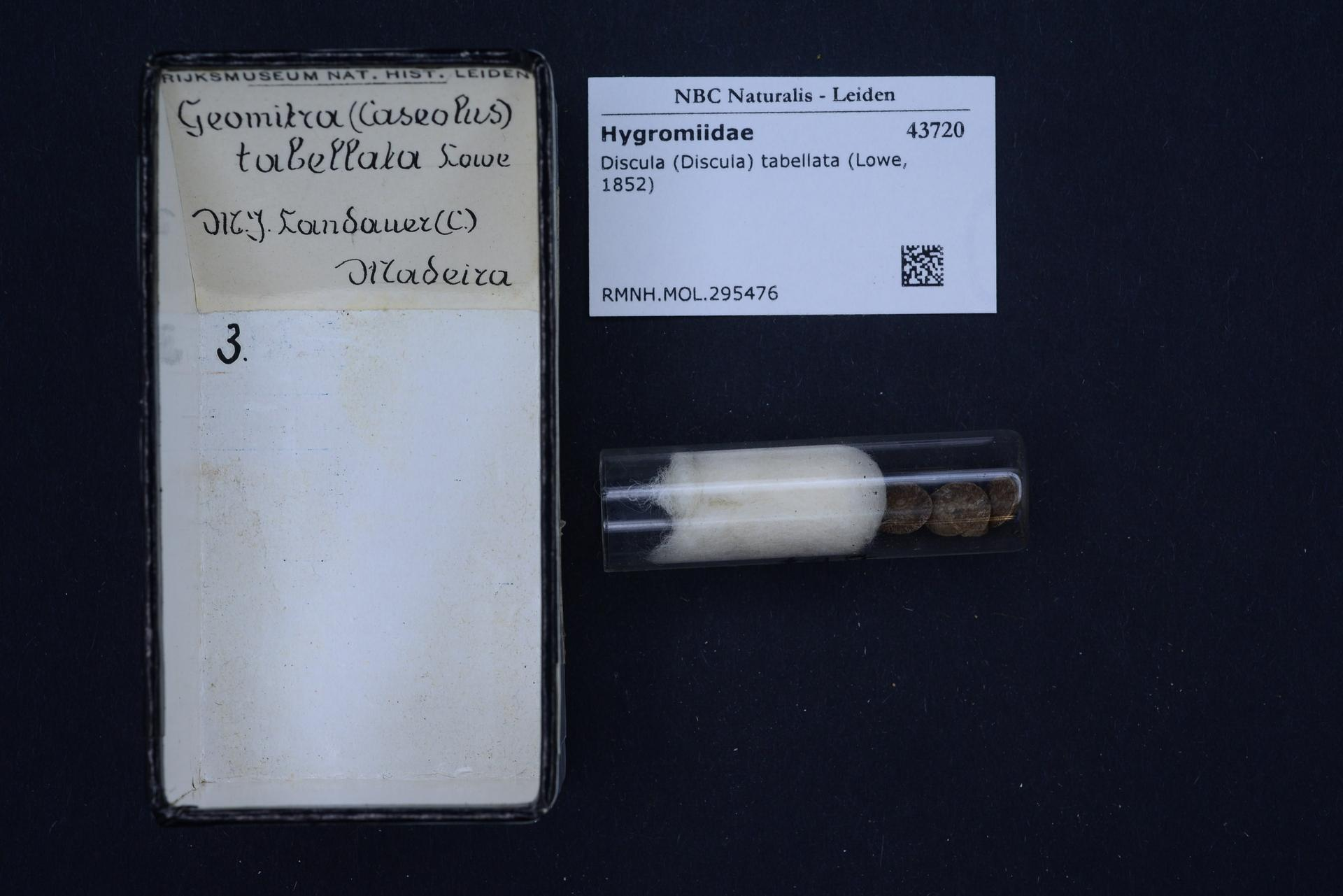

Conservation status
- Critically Endangered (IUCN 3.1)

Scientific classification
- Kingdom: Animalia
- Phylum: Mollusca
- Class: Gastropoda
- Order: Stylommatophora
- Family: Geomitridae
- Genus: Discula
- Species: D. tabellata

Binomial name
- Discula tabellata (R. T. Lowe, 1852)

= Discula tabellata =

Species of gastropod

Discula tabellata is a species of small air-breathing land snail, a terrestrial pulmonate gastropod mollusk in the family Geomitridae.

== Distribution ==
This species occurs in Madeira, Portugal.

== Shell description ==
The shell of these snails is shaped like a discus, or a lens, with a sharp edge around the periphery of the whorls.

== Conservation status ==
This species is endangered, as mentioned in annexes II and IV of Habitats Directive.
