= Desertas Islands =

Small Portuguese archipelago

Native name: Ilhas Desertas
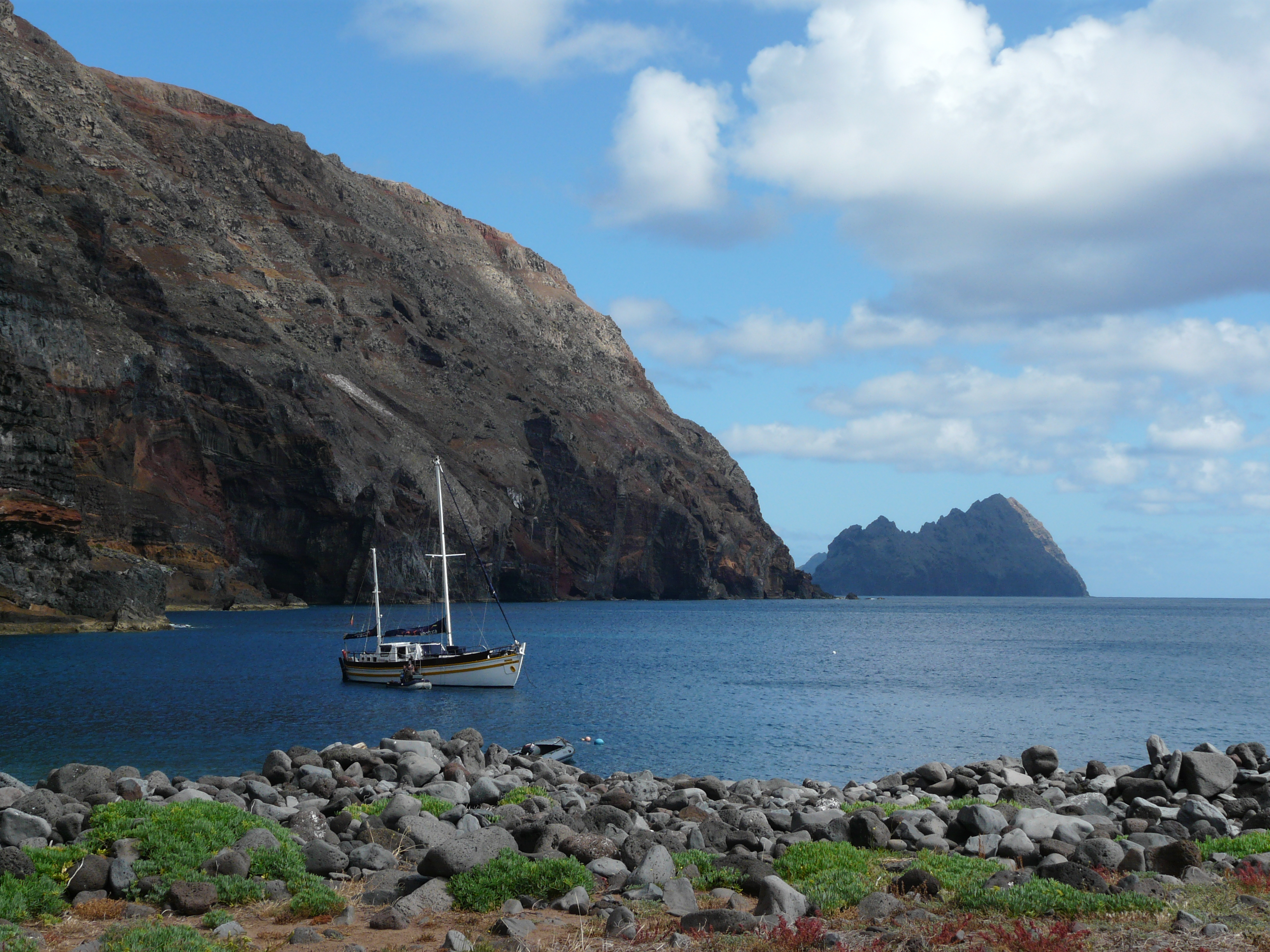
- Visiting sailboat at the bay of the Ilhas Desertas Nature Reserve. The islands are uninhabited.

- Location of the Desertas Islands archipelago, in the Madeira Islands Archipelago, Macaronesia.

Geography
- Location: Atlantic Ocean
- Area: 14.21 km^{2} (5.49 sq mi)
- Length: 22.34 km (13.881 mi)
- Width: 1.34 km (0.833 mi)

Administration
- Portugal
- Autonomous Region: Madeira
- Municipality: Santa Cruz
- Freguesia: Santa Cruz

The Desertas Islands (Portuguese: Ilhas Desertas, IPA: [ˈiʎɐʒ ðɨˈzɛɾtɐʃ], "Deserted Islands") are a small archipelago in the Atlantic Ocean, part of the larger Portuguese Madeira Archipelago.

The archipelago is located off the coast of Morocco. Deserta Grande Island is located about 25 kilometres (16 mi) southeast of the eastern tip of Madeira Island, Ponta de São Lourenço.

== Geography ==
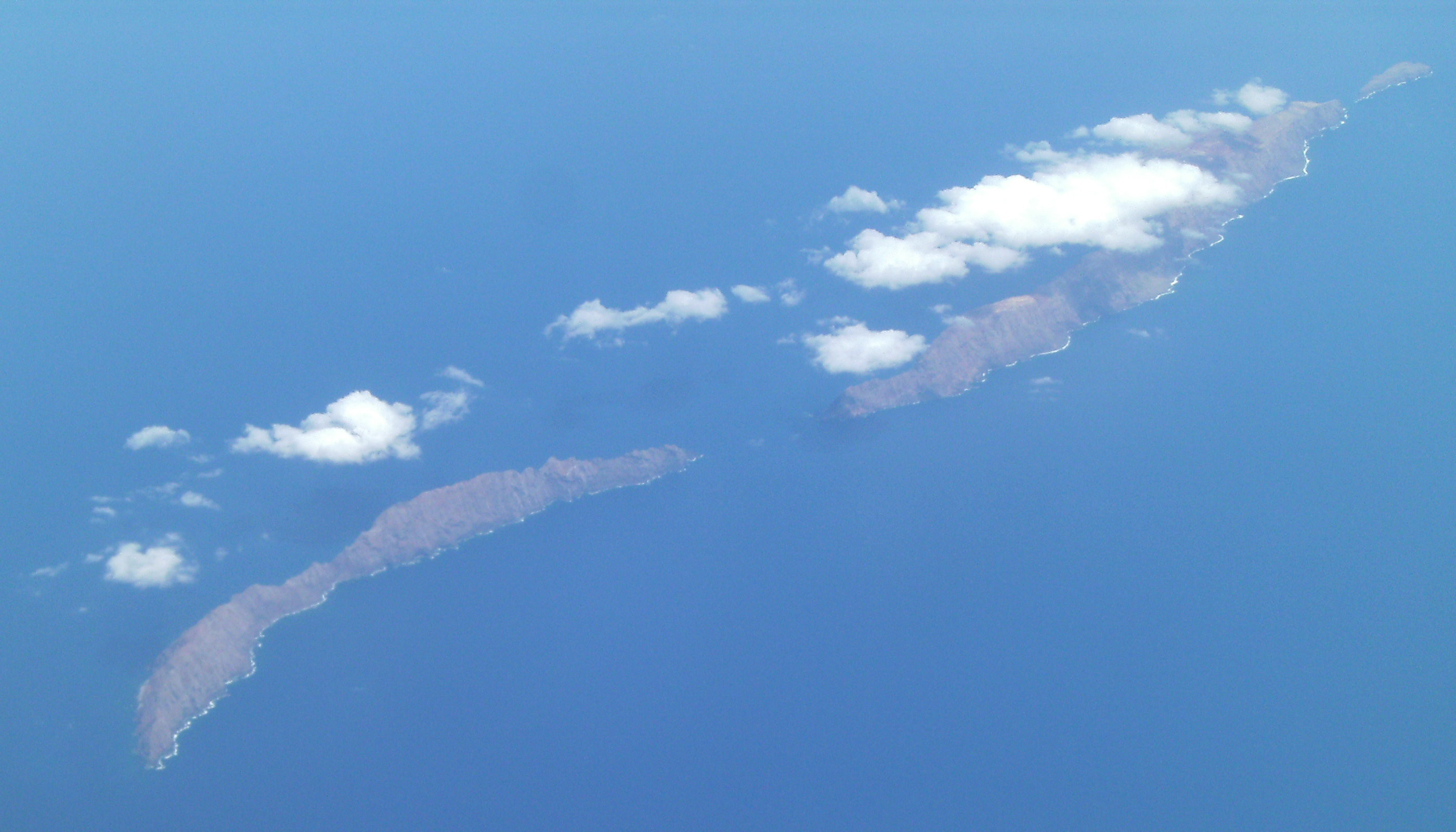
Aerial view of the Desertas Islands (Ilhas Desertas)

The archipelago of the Desertas Islands is a chain of three long and narrow islands that stretch over a north/south distance of 22.3 kilometres (13.9 mi). The Desertas Islands, from north to south with approximate area figures, are:

Island	Area (km^{2})	Height (m)
Chão Islet	1	98
Deserta Grande	10	442
Bugio	3	348
TOTAL	14.21	442

=== Administration ===
Administratively, the islands are part of the Municipality of Santa Cruz in Madeira, and in the Santa Cruz civil parish.

The islands are a designated Portuguese nature reserve. A licence is needed to land there.

== Natural history ==
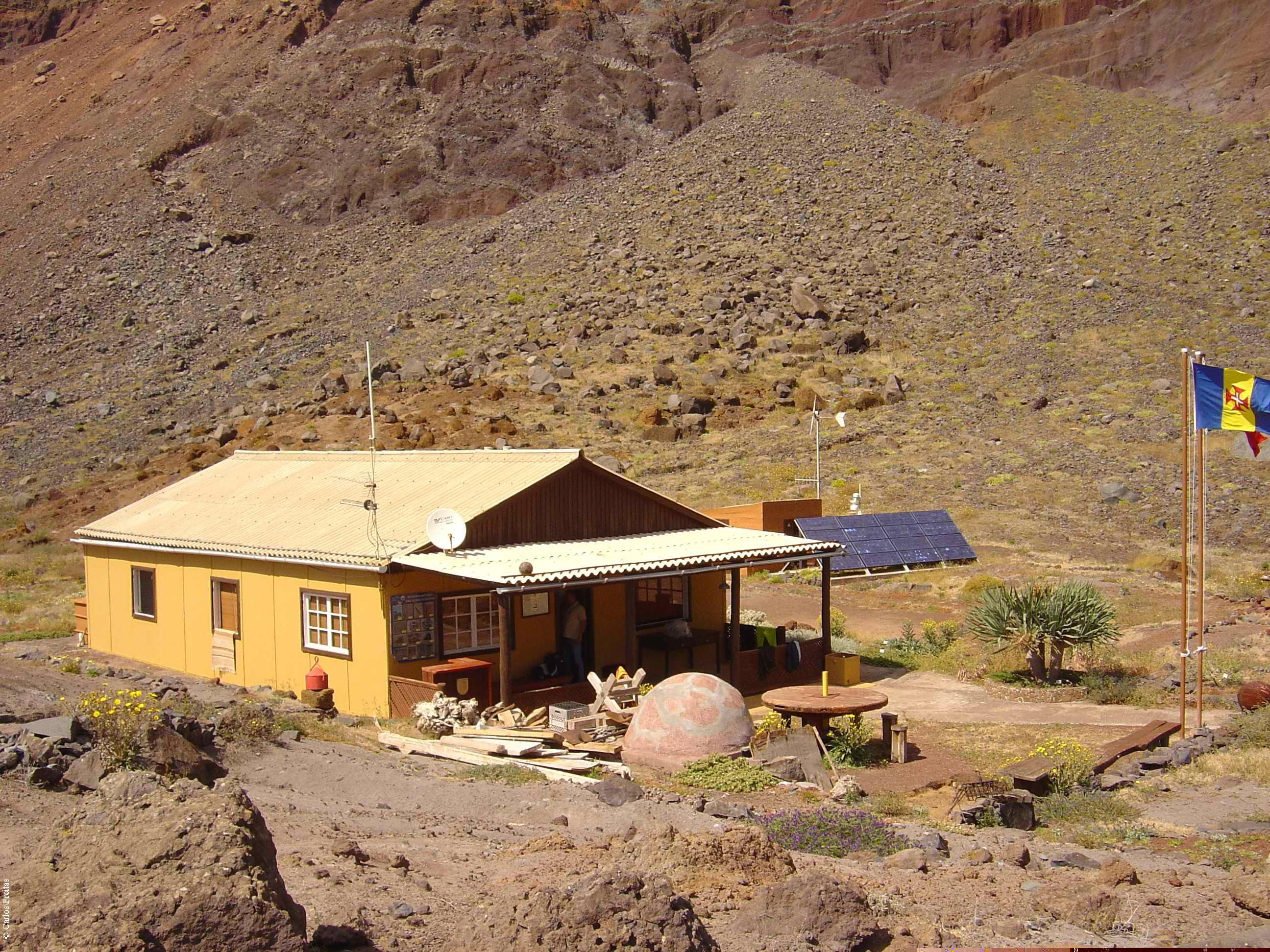
Nature reserve warden's house on Deserta Grande Island

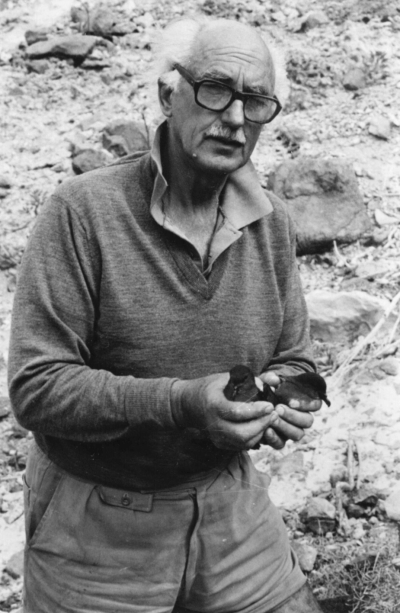
Paul Alexander Zino

Though near the main island of Madeira, where the islands can often be seen on the horizon, the geology of the Ilhas Desertas is starkly different. The high, long, and rocky islands of the group are barren of topsoil, and the only vertebrate wildlife consists of about sixteen species of birds, including eight species of seabirds, and a scarce population of feral goats, rabbits, and rodents, brought from Portugal by the mariners who first reached the rocky shores. The Deserta Grande wolf spider and Madeiran wall lizard also exist in the fragile and arid ecosystem. There are a number of endemic arthropods and other invertebrates, however, that are more poorly studied. These include two species of endemic land snail: Discula lyelliana and Geomitra grabhami. They had not been observed for over a century, and were presumed extinct by the early 21st century. However, during conservation expeditions conducted between 2012 and 2017, experts from the Institute for Nature Conservation and Forests rediscovered small populations of the two snail species, each with fewer than 200 individuals. These snails were transferred to zoos in the UK and France and successfully bred in captivity. In 2024, more than 1300 of them were reintroduced to the wild on Bugio Island.

The only inhabitable island, with its own water source, is Deserta Grande. This water is murky and scarce, and historic attempts to colonise the island failed due to the impracticability of agriculture.

A tiny colony of Mediterranean monk seals inhabits the beaches, and since 1990 the islands have been constituted as a nature reserve for their protection. In 1998, the colony numbered only eight; now the population is approximately forty seals. The only humans on the islands are the permanent wardens, geologists, occasional boaters, and those who work at the few research stations.

=== Important Bird Area ===
The Desertas archipelago has been recognised as an Important Bird Area (IBA) by BirdLife International because of its seabird colonies. These include Fea's and Bulwer's petrels, Cory's and Barolo shearwaters, band-rumped storm petrels, common terns and Caspian gulls.

== See also ==
- Islands of the Autonomous Region of Madeira
- List of islands of Portugal
