= Atlantica (gastropod) =

Scientific classification
- Domain: Eukaryota
- Kingdom: Animalia
- Phylum: Mollusca
- Class: Gastropoda
- Order: Stylommatophora
- Family: Gastrodontidae
- Genus: Atlantica; Ancey, 1887

Genus of gastropods

Atlantica is a genus of snails in the family Gastrodontidae.

== Species ==
The genus includes two species:

- Atlantica calathoides (R.T.Lowe, 1863)
- Atlantica gueriniana (R.T.Lowe, 1852)
