= Geomitra tiarella =

Conservation status
- Endangered (IUCN 3.1)

Scientific classification
- Kingdom: Animalia
- Phylum: Mollusca
- Class: Gastropoda
- Order: Stylommatophora
- Family: Geomitridae
- Genus: Geomitra
- Species: G. tiarella

Binomial name
- Geomitra tiarella Webb & Berthelot, 1833

Species of gastropod

Geomitra tiarella is a species of air-breathing land snail, terrestrial pulmonate gastropod mollusks in the family Geomitridae.

This species is endemic to Madeira, Portugal.
