= Amphorella hypselia =

Conservation status
- Vulnerable (IUCN 3.1)

Scientific classification
- Kingdom: Animalia
- Phylum: Mollusca
- Class: Gastropoda
- Order: Stylommatophora
- Family: Ferussaciidae
- Genus: Amphorella
- Species: A. hypselia

Binomial name
- Amphorella hypselia (Pilsbry, 1909)

Synonyms
- Achatina producta Lowe, 1852; Ferrussacia producta (Lowe,1852); Ferussacia hypselia Pilsbry, 1909; Glandina producta (Lowe,1852); Lovea producta (Lowe,1852)

Species of gastropod

Amphorella hypselia is a species of air-breathing land snail, a terrestrial gastropod mollusc in the family Ferussaciidae.

== Description ==
(Original description in Latin) Cecilioides acicula (O. F. Müller, 1774) is similar, but with a shell that is twice as large, more solid, and robust, and is thus completely distinct in appearance.

It differs from Amphorella gracilis (R. T. Lowe, 1831) by having a more solid, non-hyaline shell, an aperture that is obliquely produced upward and backward, and a columella that is prominently truncated versus notched at the base.

== Distribution ==
This species is endemic to Madeira, Portugal.
