= Discula cheiranthicola =

Conservation status
- Near Threatened (IUCN 3.1)

Scientific classification
- Kingdom: Animalia
- Phylum: Mollusca
- Class: Gastropoda
- Order: Stylommatophora
- Family: Geomitridae
- Genus: Discula
- Species: D. cheiranthicola

Binomial name
- Discula cheiranthicola (R. T. Lowe, 1831)

Species of gastropod

Discula cheiranthicola is a species of air-breathing land snail, a terrestrial pulmonate gastropod mollusk in the family Geomitridae.

This species is endemic to Madeira, Portugal.
