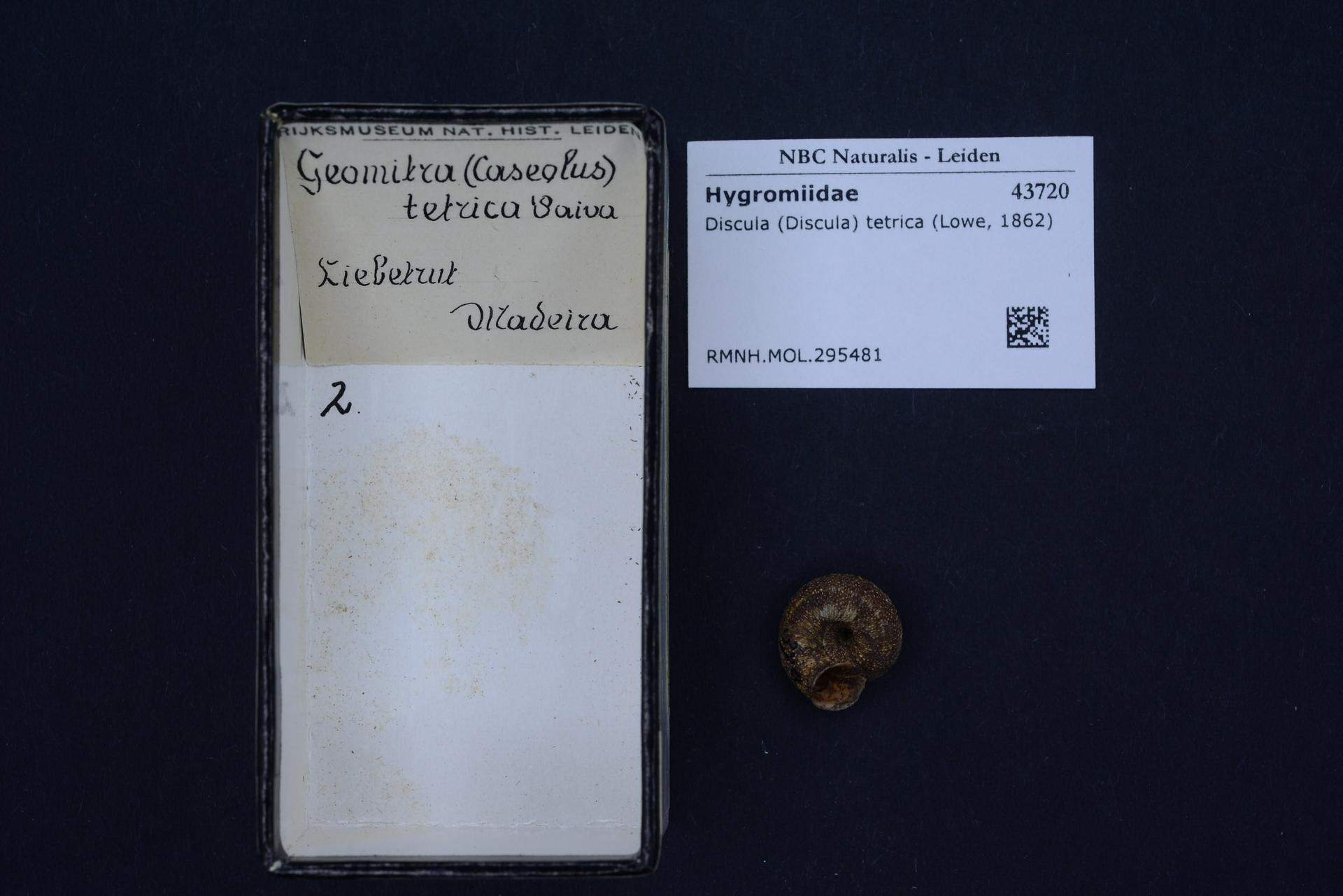
- Discula (Discula) tetrica (Lowe, 1862)

Conservation status
- Critically endangered, possibly extinct (IUCN 3.1)

Scientific classification
- Kingdom: Animalia
- Phylum: Mollusca
- Class: Gastropoda
- Order: Stylommatophora
- Family: Geomitridae
- Genus: Discula
- Species: D. tetrica

Binomial name
- Discula tetrica (R. T. Lowe, 1862)

= Discula tetrica =

Extinct species of gastropod

Discula tetrica is a species of air-breathing land snail, a terrestrial pulmonate gastropod mollusk in the family Geomitridae.

This species is endemic to Bugio, Madeira, Portugal.

Discula tetrica is listed as Critically endangered in the 1996 IUCN Red List, but it is considered to be possibly extinct.
