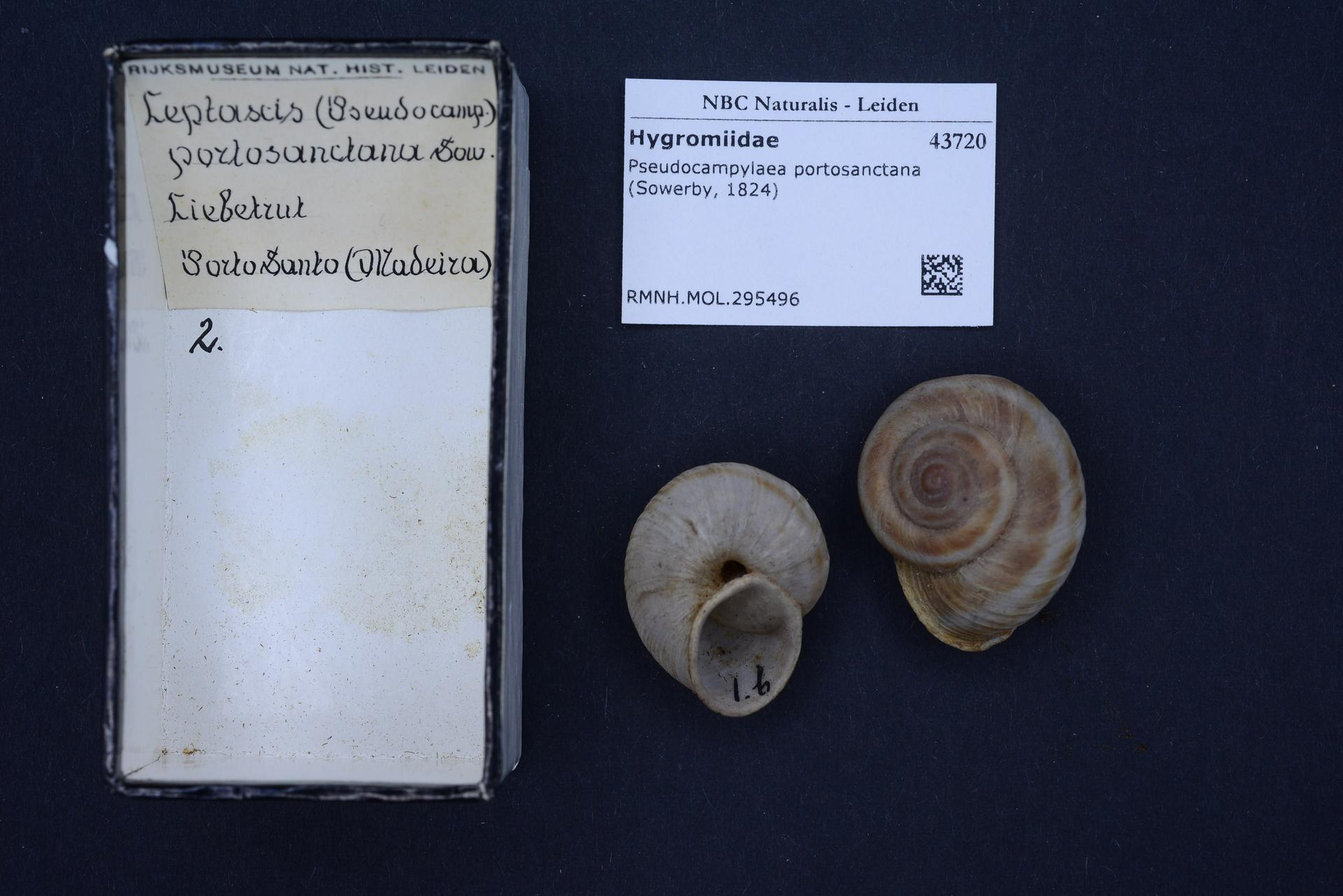

Scientific classification
- Kingdom: Animalia
- Phylum: Mollusca
- Class: Gastropoda
- Order: Stylommatophora
- Family: Geomitridae
- Subfamily: Geomitrinae
- Genus: Pseudocampylaea; Pfeiffer, 1877

= Pseudocampylaea =

Genus of gastropods

Pseudocampylaea is a genus of air-breathing land snails, terrestrial pulmonate gastropod mollusks in the subfamily Geomitrinae of the family Geomitridae, the hairy snails and their allies.

== Species ==
Species within the genus Pseudocampyaea include:

- Pseudocampylaea lowii (A. Férussac, 1835)
- Pseudocampylaea portosanctana (G. B. Sowerby I, 1824) - the type species
