= Madeiran land snail =

Madeiran land snail is a common name which has been given to several different species of terrestrial gastropods, air-breathing land snails:

- Caseolus calculus
- Discula lyelliana, found only on the Desertas Islands in the Madeira Archipelago; critically endangered
- Geomitra grabhami, critically endangered; remnant populations present on Desertas Islands of Madeira
- Geomitra moniziana
- Leiostyla abbreviata, extinct
- Leiostyla cassida
- Leiostyla corneocostata
- Leiostyla gibba, extinct
