= Amphorella iridescens =

Conservation status
- Vulnerable (IUCN 3.1)

Scientific classification
- Kingdom: Animalia
- Phylum: Mollusca
- Class: Gastropoda
- Order: Stylommatophora
- Superfamily: Achatinoidea
- Family: Ferussaciidae
- Genus: Amphorella
- Species: A. iridescens

Binomial name
- Amphorella iridescens (Wollaston, 1878)

Species of gastropod

Amphorella iridescens is a species of air-breathing land snail, a terrestrial pulmonate gastropod mollusk in the family Ferussaciidae.

This species is endemic to Madeira, Portugal.
