= Serratorotula =

Scientific classification
- Domain: Eukaryota
- Kingdom: Animalia
- Phylum: Mollusca
- Class: Gastropoda
- Order: Stylommatophora
- Superfamily: Helicoidea
- Family: Geomitridae
- Subfamily: Geomitrinae
- Genus: Serratorotula; Groh & Hemmen, 1986

Synonyms
- Geomitra (Serratorotula) Groh & Hemmen, 1986 (original rank)

Genus of gastropods

Serratorotula is a genus of air-breathing land snails, terrestrial pulmonate gastropod molluscs in the family Geomitridae, the hairy snails and their allies.

== Species ==
Species within the genus Serratorotula include:

- †Serratorotula acarinata (Hemmen & Groh, 1985)
- Serratorotula coronata (Deshayes, 1850)
- †Serratorotula gerberi (Groh & Hemmen, 1986)
- Serratorotula juliformis (R. T. Lowe, 1852)
