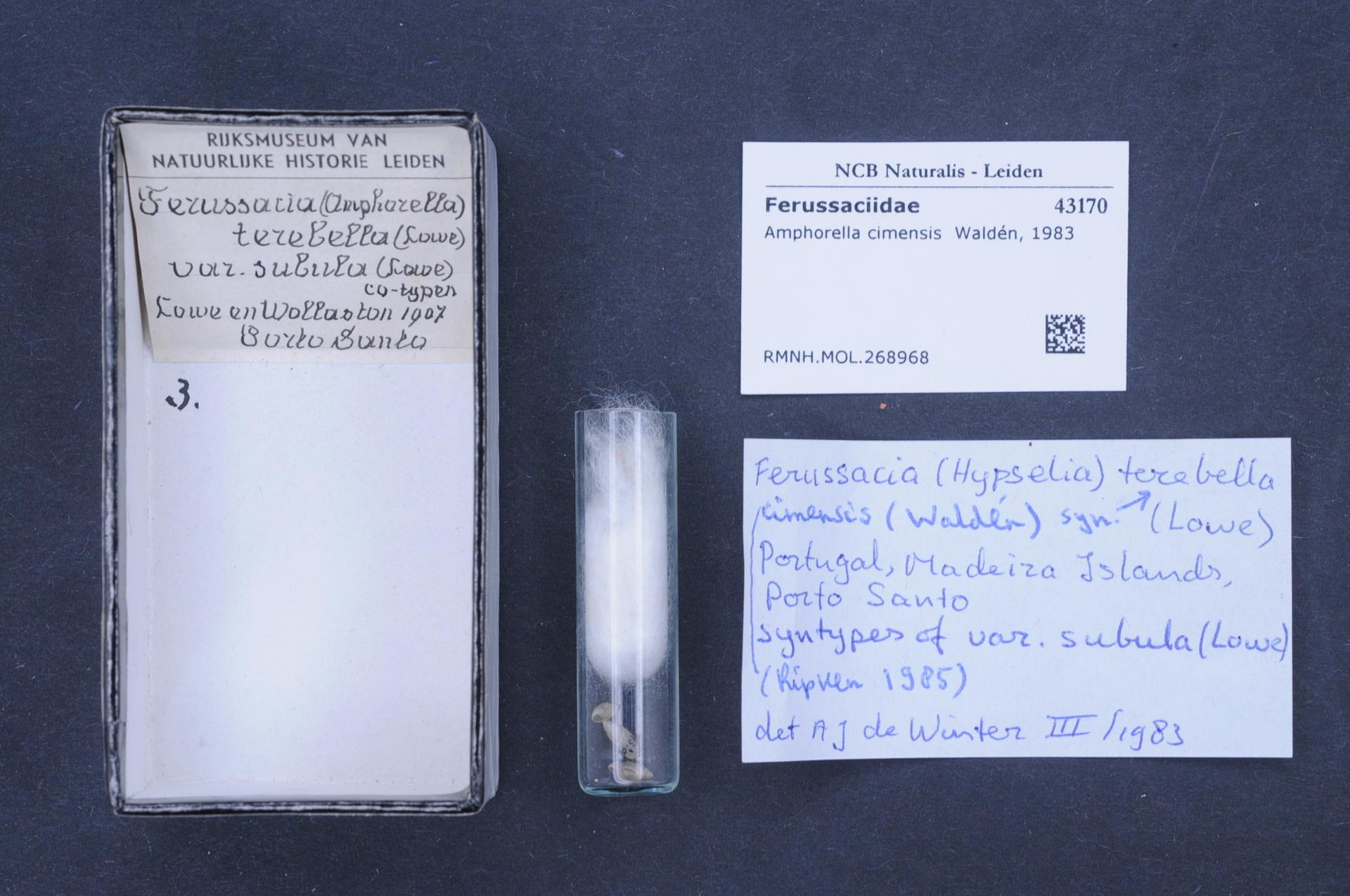
- Amphorella cimensis Waldén, 1983

Conservation status
- Near Threatened (IUCN 3.1)

Scientific classification
- Kingdom: Animalia
- Phylum: Mollusca
- Class: Gastropoda
- Order: Stylommatophora
- Superfamily: Achatinoidea
- Family: Ferussaciidae
- Genus: Amphorella
- Species: A. cimensis

Binomial name
- Amphorella cimensis Walden, 1983

= Amphorella cimensis =

Species of gastropod

Amphorella cimensis is a species of air-breathing land snail, a terrestrial pulmonate gastropod mollusk in the family Ferussaciidae.

== Distribution and habitat ==
This species is endemic to Madeira, Portugal, where it is restricted to Porto Santo Island and the adjacent islets of Cal and Cima. The survival of this species is threatened by habitat loss and degradation, especially because of tourism development around coastal bays of Porto Santo. The recent programmes of both eradication of rabbits and removal of introduced plants have led to major improvements in the habitats on Cal and Cima. This snail can be found on bare earth beneath stones and logs.
