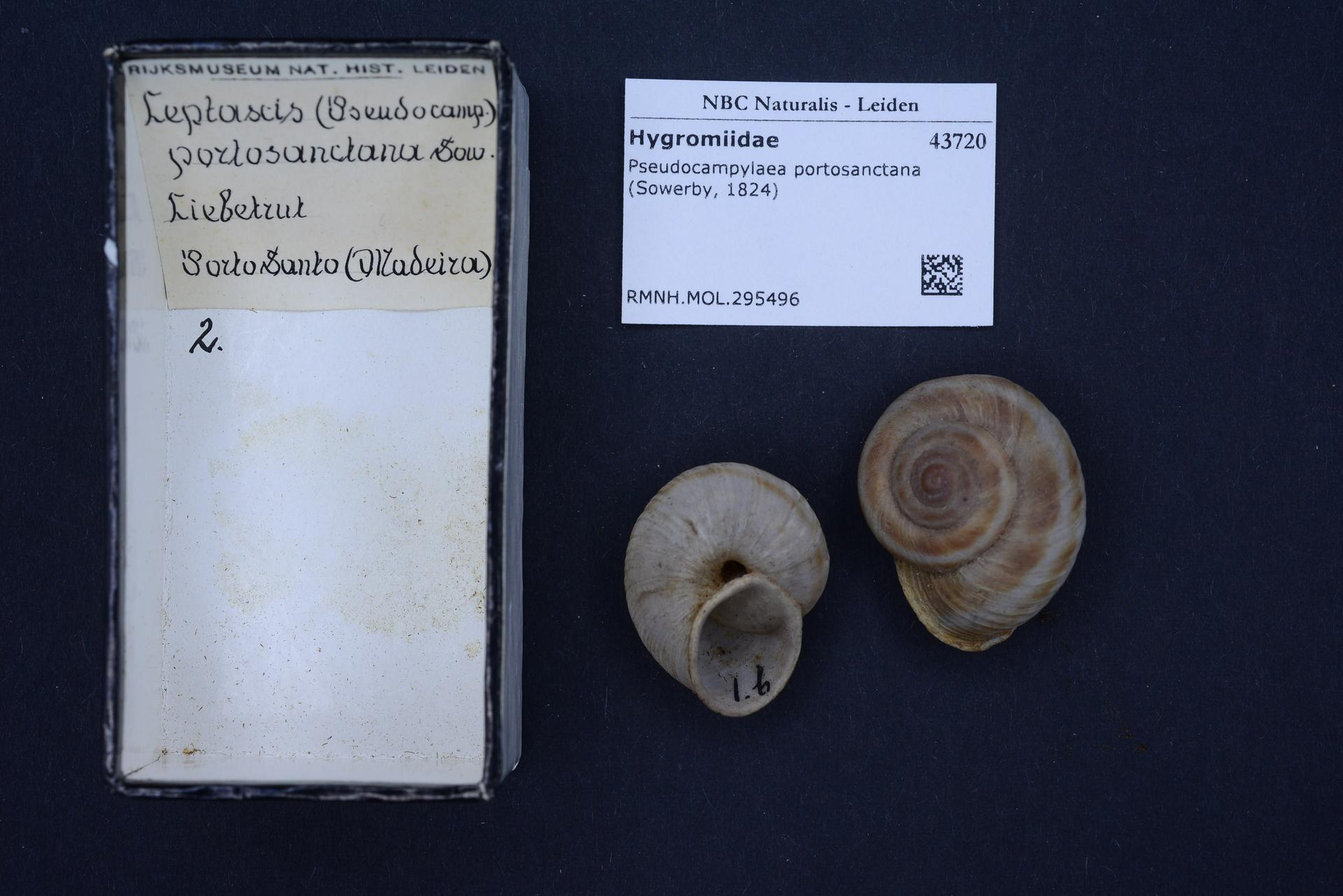

Conservation status
- Least Concern (IUCN 3.1)

Scientific classification
- Kingdom: Animalia
- Phylum: Mollusca
- Class: Gastropoda
- Order: Stylommatophora
- Family: Geomitridae
- Subfamily: Geomitrinae
- Genus: Pseudocampylaea
- Species: P. portosanctana

Binomial name
- Pseudocampylaea portosanctana (Sowerby I, 1824)

= Pseudocampylaea portosanctana =

Species of gastropod

Pseudocampylaea portosanctana is a species of air-breathing land snail, a terrestrial pulmonate gastropod mollusk in the family Geomitridae, the hairy snails and their allies.

This species is endemic to the island of Porto Santo, Madeira archipelago, Portugal.
