= Callina bulverii =

Conservation status
- Critically Endangered (IUCN 3.1)

Scientific classification
- Kingdom: Animalia
- Phylum: Mollusca
- Class: Gastropoda
- Order: Stylommatophora
- Family: Geomitridae
- Genus: Callina
- Species: C. bulverii

Binomial name
- Callina bulverii (W. Wood, 1828)

Synonyms
- Discula (Discula) bulverii (W. Wood, 1828) · unaccepted (superseded generic combination); Discula bulweri (Wood, 1828) [orth. error]; Helix (Helicogena) bulveriana R. T. Lowe, 1831 (junior synonym); Helix (Tectula) albersii R. T. Lowe, 1852 (junior synonym); Helix bulverii W. Wood, 1828 (original combination); Ochthephila (Tectula) bulverii (W. Wood, 1828) superseded combination

Species of gastropod

Callina bulverii is a species of air-breathing land snail, a terrestrial pulmonate gastropod mollusk in the family Geomitridae.

== Description ==
((Original description in Latin of Helix (Helicogena) bulveriana R. T. Lowe, 1831) The shell is rounded and depressed, hemispherical in form and coiled, with a nearly flat upper surface. It is sharply keeled, thin, and somewhat glossy, its entire surface being covered with exceedingly fine, densely packed granules. The coloration is dark chestnut-brown, with banding on the upper side. The spire is convexly depressed, more or less elevated, and very blunt, while the suture is indistinct. The whorls are flat and even, appearing almost worn smooth or merging into one another. The body whorl bears an extremely sharp, slender keel, above which runs a distinct groove bordered by a raised rim. The umbilicus is open, spiral, and deep. The aperture is rounded and crescent-shaped, and the peristome is discontinuous, thickened near the umbilicus, and reflected outward.

== Distribution ==
This species is endemic to Porto Santo Island, Madeira, Portugal.
