= Leiostyla gibba =

Conservation status
- Critically endangered, possibly extinct (IUCN 3.1)

Scientific classification
- Kingdom: Animalia
- Phylum: Mollusca
- Class: Gastropoda
- Order: Stylommatophora
- Family: Lauriidae
- Genus: Leiostyla
- Species: L. gibba

Binomial name
- Leiostyla gibba (R. T. Lowe, 1852)

Extinct species of gastropod

Leiostyla gibba is a species of small, air-breathing land snail, a terrestrial pulmonate gastropod mollusk in the family Lauriidae. This species is mentioned in Annexes II and IV of the Habitats Directive. It is one of several species sometimes referred as Madeiran land snail.

Leiostyla gibba is listed as Critically Endangered in the 2011 IUCN Red List, but now may possibly be extinct.

== Distribution ==
This species was endemic to Madeira, Portugal.
