= Geomitra moniziana =

Conservation status
- Endangered (IUCN 3.1)

Scientific classification
- Kingdom: Animalia
- Phylum: Mollusca
- Class: Gastropoda
- Order: Stylommatophora
- Family: Geomitridae
- Genus: Geomitra
- Species: G. moniziana

Binomial name
- Geomitra moniziana Paiva, 1867

Species of gastropod

Geomitra moniziana is a species of air-breathing land snail, terrestrial pulmonate gastropod mollusks in the family Geomitridae.

This species is endemic to Madeira, Portugal. It is mentioned in annexes II and IV of the Habitats Directive.

It is often called the Madeiran land snail, but this is also used as a name for several other species in various genera.
