= Hystricella bicarinata =

Conservation status
- Near Threatened (IUCN 3.1)

Scientific classification
- Kingdom: Animalia
- Phylum: Arthropoda
- Clade: Pancrustacea
- Class: Insecta
- Order: Lepidoptera
- Family: Geometridae
- Genus: Hystricella
- Species: H. bicarinata

Binomial name
- Hystricella bicarinata (G.B.Sowerby I, 1824)

Synonyms
- Discula bicarinata Sowerby I; Geomitra bicarinata (G. B. Sowerby I, 1824); Helix (Helicella) duplicata R. T. Lowe, 1831 (junior synonym); Helix (Hystricella) bicarinata G. B. Sowerby I, 1824 ·; Helix bicarinata G. B. Sowerby I, 1824 (original combination); Hystricella bicarinata bicarinata (G. B. Sowerby I, 1824)

Species of gastropod

Hystricella bicarinata is a species of air-breathing land snail, a terrestrial pulmonate gastropod mollusk in the family Geomitridae, the hairy snails and their allies.

Two subspecies are recognised, one extant and one known only as a fossil.

== Description ==
(Original description) This minute species exhibits a rather globular form with a short, slightly conical spire. The spire comprises five squarish whorls, each featuring two central carinae (keels), the upper of which is rather obtuse. The aperture is entire and round, with a distinct peristome. The umbilicus is small. A notable characteristic is the surface, which is covered with a granular epidermis.

== Distribution ==
This species is endemic to the island of Porto Santo in the Madeira archipelago, Portugal. They are terrestrial and are found under rocks in grasslands. They have a very limited range, confined to about ten square kilometers but are abundant within that area.
