= Atlantica gueriniana =

Madeiran land snail

Conservation status
- Critically endangered, possibly extinct (IUCN 3.1)

Scientific classification
- Kingdom: Animalia
- Phylum: Mollusca
- Class: Gastropoda
- Order: Stylommatophora
- Family: Gastrodontidae
- Genus: Atlantica
- Species: A. gueriniana

Binomial name
- Atlantica gueriniana (R. T. Lowe, 1852)

Synonyms
- Atlantica guerinianus; Discus guerinianus (Lowe, 1852); Helix gueriana; Helix gueriniana Lowe, 1852; Helix guerinianus; Helix semiplicata L. Pfeiffer, 1852

Species of land snail

Atlantica gueriniana is a species of small air-breathing land snail, a terrestrial gastropod mollusk presently in the family Gastrodontidae, but formerly in Discidae, the disk snails.

== Distribution ==
This species is endemic to Madeira, Portugal.

== Shell description ==
The shell of these snails is shaped like a discus, or a lens, with a noticeable "edge" around the periphery of the whorls.

== Conservation status ==
This species is mentioned in annexes IV and IV of the Habitats Directive.
