= Caseolus calvus =

Conservation status
- Endangered (IUCN 3.1)

Scientific classification
- Kingdom: Animalia
- Phylum: Mollusca
- Class: Gastropoda
- Order: Stylommatophora
- Family: Geomitridae
- Genus: Caseolus
- Species: C. calvus

Binomial name
- Caseolus calvus (R. T. Lowe, 1831)

Species of gastropod

Caseolus calvus is a species of small air-breathing land snail, terrestrial pulmonate gastropod mollusks in the family Geomitridae, the hairy snails and their allies.

== Subspecies ==
- Caseolus calvus calvus (R. T. Lowe, 1831)
- Caseolus calvus galeatus (R. T. Lowe, 1862)

The subspecies Caseolus calvus galeatus (R. T. Lowe, 1862) endemic to Madeira is globally extinct.

== Distribution ==
This species of land snail lives in Madeira, Portugal.
