= Pseudocampylaea lowii =

Conservation status
- Extinct (yes) (IUCN 3.1)

Scientific classification
- Kingdom: Animalia
- Phylum: Mollusca
- Class: Gastropoda
- Order: Stylommatophora
- Family: Geomitridae
- Genus: Pseudocampylaea
- Species: †P. lowii

Binomial name
- †Pseudocampylaea lowii (A. Férussac, 1835)

Extinct species of gastropod

Pseudocampylaea lowii is an extinct species of air-breathing land snail, a terrestrial pulmonate gastropod mollusc in the family Hygromiidae, the hairy snails and their allies.

== Distribution ==
This species was endemic to Madeira, Portugal.
