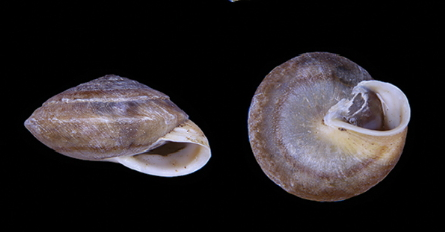
- Shell of Callina rotula

Conservation status
- Least Concern (IUCN 3.1)

Scientific classification
- Kingdom: Animalia
- Phylum: Mollusca
- Class: Gastropoda
- Order: Stylommatophora
- Family: Geomitridae
- Genus: Callina
- Species: C. rotula

Binomial name
- Callina rotula (R. T. Lowe, 1831)

Synonyms
- Discula (Callina) rotula (R. T. Lowe, 1831) (superseded generic combination); Discula rotula (R. T. Lowe, 1831) (superseded generic combination); Helix rotula R. T. Lowe, 1831 (original combination); Ochthephila (Callina) rotula (R. T. Lowe, 1831) superseded combination

= Callina rotula =

Species of gastropod

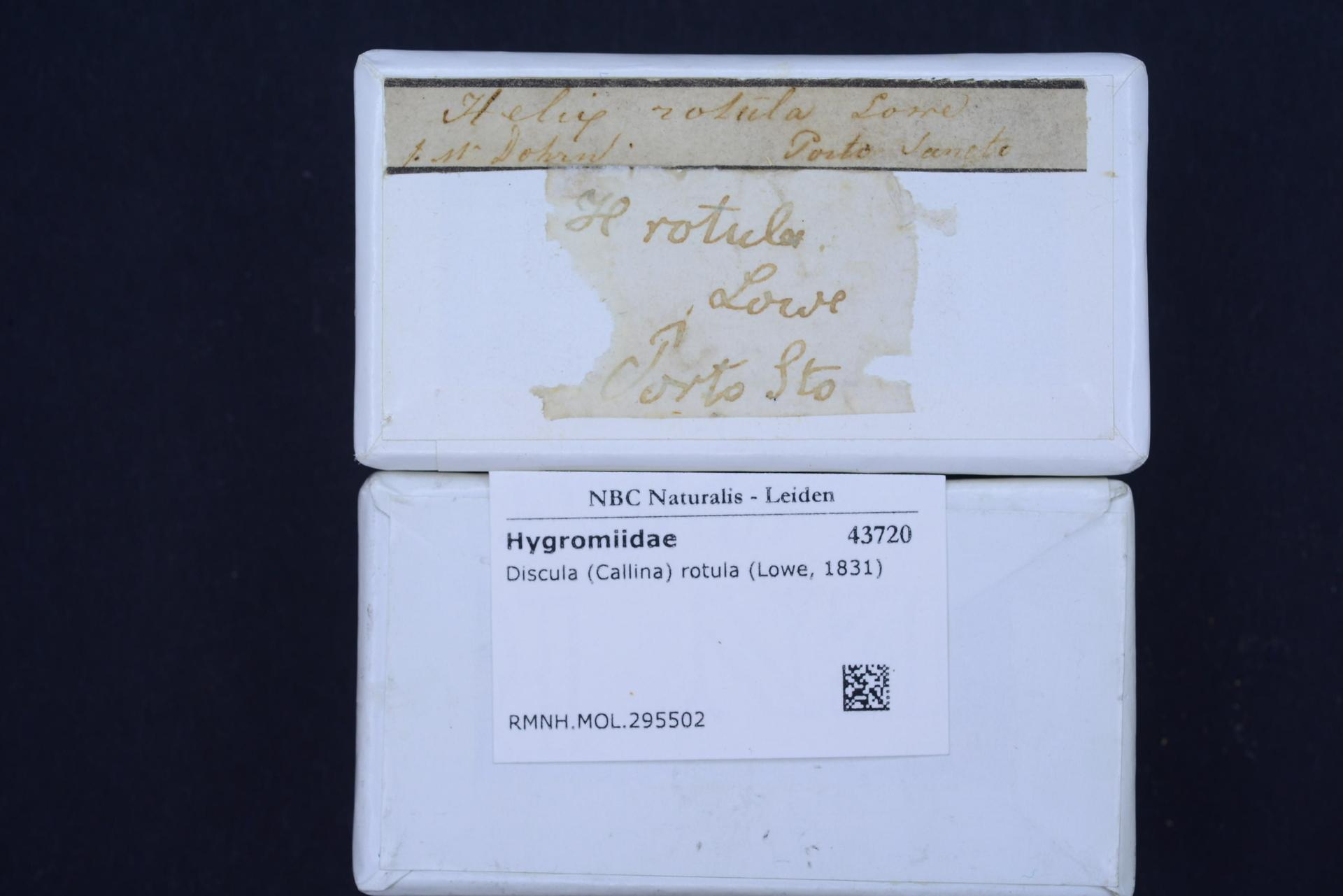
Discula (Callina) rotula (Lowe, 1831)

Callina rotula is a species of air-breathing land snail, a terrestrial pulmonate gastropod mollusc in the family Geomitridae.

It was first described by Richard Thomas Lowe, in 1831, as Helix rotula, part of the genus Helix.

== Habitat ==
This species is endemic to the Porto Santo Island, Madeira, Portugal, where it can be found under rocks.

== Description ==
(Original description in Latin) The shell is rounded, conoidally flattened, somewhat flattened above, nearly perforate, keeled, rough, slightly shiny, and banded. It features a conoidal, highly obtuse spire and a indistinct suture. The whorls are flat, transversely striated, and covered with small granules; the body whorl is sharply keeled, though the keel becomes obsolete near the peristome.

The aperture is crescent-shaped and expanded outward. The peristome is thickened on the inside, sharp, and slightly expanded; at the inner angle, it is turned back, calloused, and covers the perforation.

The shell of this snail has a discoid shape with small transversal grooves and some granules scattered along the sutures. This brownish-yellow shell is somewhat concave at its base. The oblique aperture has an oval shape. The shell is characteristic by its horizontal stripe on the last body whorl and two stripes at its base.
