= Geomitra delphinuloides =

Conservation status
- Extinct

Scientific classification
- Kingdom: Animalia
- Phylum: Mollusca
- Class: Gastropoda
- Order: Stylommatophora
- Family: Geomitridae
- Genus: Geomitra
- Species: †G. delphinuloides

Binomial name
- †Geomitra delphinuloides (R. T. Lowe, 1860)

Extinct species of gastropod

Geomitra delphinuloides is an extinct species of air-breathing land snails, terrestrial pulmonate gastropod mollusks in the family Geomitridae.

Geomitra delphinuloides was listed as critically endangered in the 1996 IUCN Red List, but it is considered to be extinct.

== Distribution ==
This species was endemic to Madeira, Portugal.
