= Leiostyla lamellosa =

Conservation status
- Extinct (yes) (IUCN 3.1)

Scientific classification
- Kingdom: Animalia
- Phylum: Mollusca
- Class: Gastropoda
- Order: Stylommatophora
- Family: Lauriidae
- Genus: Leiostyla
- Species: †L. lamellosa

Binomial name
- †Leiostyla lamellosa (R. T. Lowe, 1852)

Extinct species of gastropod

Leiostyla lamellosa is an extinct species of small air-breathing land snail, a terrestrial pulmonate gastropod mollusk in the family Lauriidae.

This species is mentioned in Annexes II and IV of the Habitats Directive.

== Distribution ==
This species was endemic to Madeira, Portugal.
