= Serratorotula coronata =

Conservation status
- Endangered (IUCN 3.1)

Scientific classification
- Kingdom: Animalia
- Phylum: Mollusca
- Class: Gastropoda
- Order: Stylommatophora
- Family: Geomitridae
- Genus: Serratorotula
- Species: S. coronata

Binomial name
- Serratorotula coronata (Deshayes, 1850)

Synonyms
- Geomitra coronata (Deshayes, 1840); Helix juliformis R.T. Lowe, 1852

Species of gastropod

Serratorotula coronata is a species of air-breathing land snail, a terrestrial pulmonate gastropod mollusc in the family Geomitridae, the hairy snails and their allies.

This species is endemic to Porto Santo Island, Madeira, Portugal. Its natural habitat is rocky areas. It is threatened by habitat loss.
