= Leiostyla abbreviata =

Conservation status
- Critically Endangered (IUCN 3.1)

Scientific classification
- Kingdom: Animalia
- Phylum: Mollusca
- Class: Gastropoda
- Order: Stylommatophora
- Family: Lauriidae
- Genus: Leiostyla
- Species: L. abbreviata

Binomial name
- Leiostyla abbreviata (R. T. Lowe, 1852)

Extinct species of gastropod

Leiostyla abbreviata is an extinct species of small air-breathing land snail, a terrestrial pulmonate gastropod mollusk in the family Lauriidae. It is one of several species sometimes referred as Madeiran land snail.

It is mentioned in annexes II and IV of Habitats Directive.

Leiostyla abbreviata was listed as Critically endangered in the 1996 IUCN Red List, but it is considered to be extinct.

== Distribution ==
This species was endemic to Madeira, Portugal.
