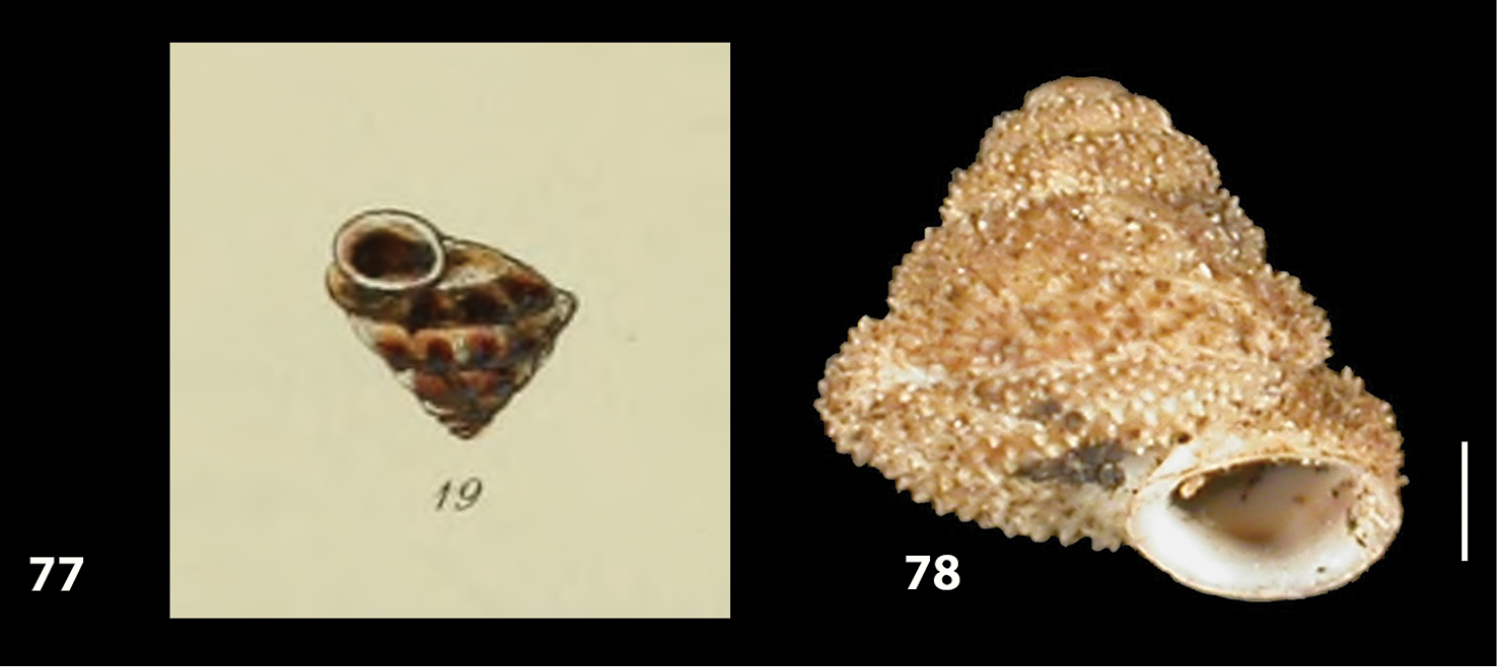
- Hystericella echinulata

Conservation status
- Endangered (IUCN 3.1)

Scientific classification
- Kingdom: Animalia
- Phylum: Arthropoda
- Clade: Pancrustacea
- Class: Insecta
- Order: Lepidoptera
- Family: Geometridae
- Genus: Hystricella
- Species: H. echinulata

Binomial name
- Hystricella echinulata (R. T. Lowe, 1831)

Synonyms
- Helix (Helicella) echinulata R. T. Lowe, 1831 (original name)

= Hystricella echinulata =

Species of gastropod

Hystricella echinulata is a species of air-breathing land snail, a terrestrial pulmonate gastropod mollusc in the family Geomitridae, the hairy snails and their allies.

This species is endemic to Madeira, Portugal.
