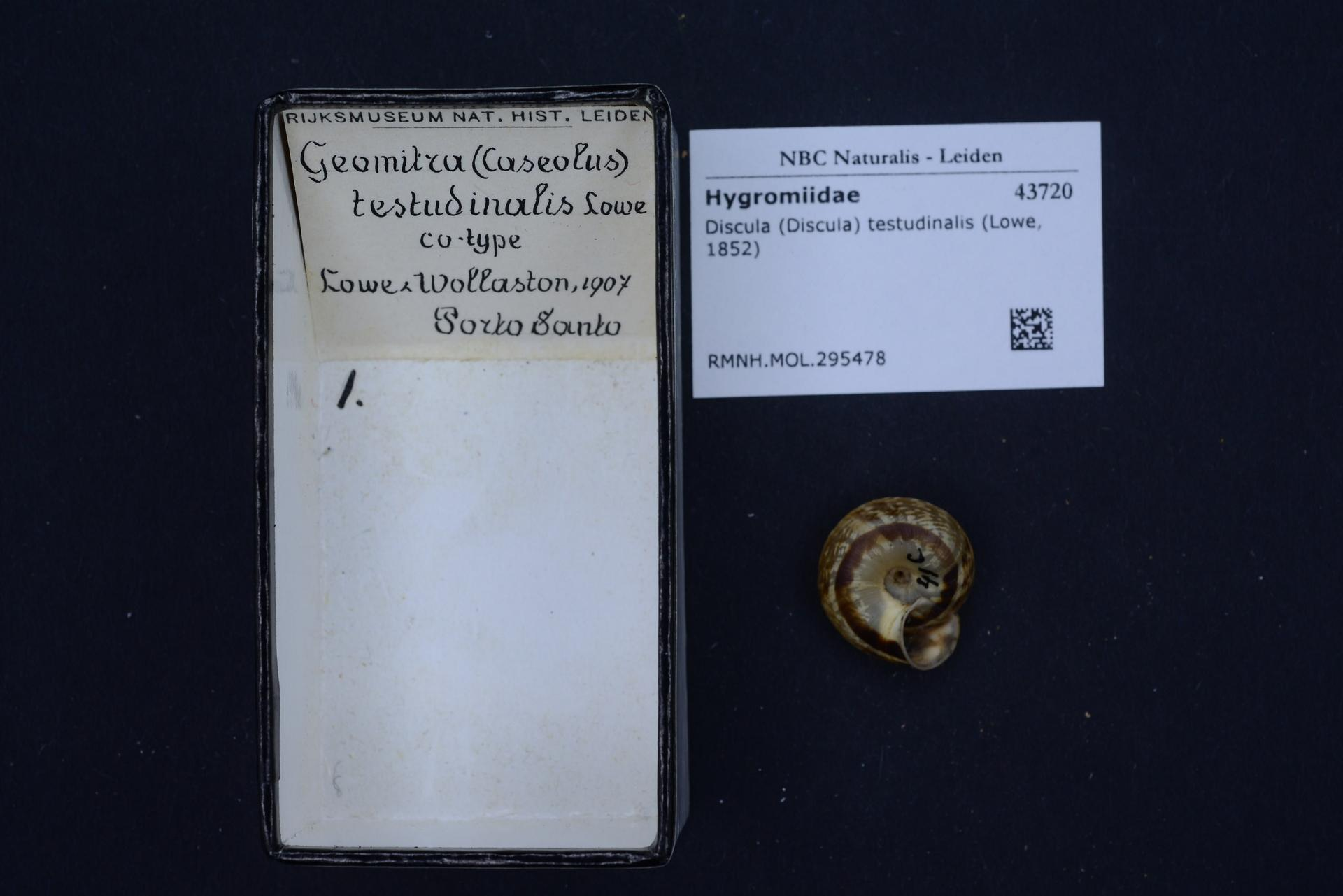
- Testudodiscula testudinalis

Conservation status
- Critically Endangered (IUCN 3.1)

Scientific classification
- Kingdom: Animalia
- Phylum: Mollusca
- Class: Gastropoda
- Order: Stylommatophora
- Family: Geomitridae
- Genus: Testudodiscula; Brozzo, De Mattia, Harl & Neiber, 2020
- Species: T. testudinalis

Binomial name
- Testudodiscula testudinalis (R. T. Lowe, 1852)

Synonyms
- Discula testudinalis (R. T. Lowe, 1852); Helix testudinalis R. T. Lowe, 1852

= Testudodiscula testudinalis =

Madeiran land snail

Species of gastropod

Testudodiscula testudinalis a species of small land snail, a terrestrial pulmonate gastropod mollusc in the family Geomitridae.

== Distribution ==
This species is endemic to the island of Madeira, Portugal.

== Shell description ==
The shell of these snails is shaped like a discus, or a lens, with a sharp edge around the periphery of the whorls.

== Conservation status ==
This species is critically endangered, as mentioned in annex IV of Habitats Directive.
