= Deserta Grande Island =

Island in Madeira region of Portugal

Coordinates: 32.5197°N 16.5075°W

Map of Deserta Islands

Location of Deserta Grande Island in the Atlantic Ocean.

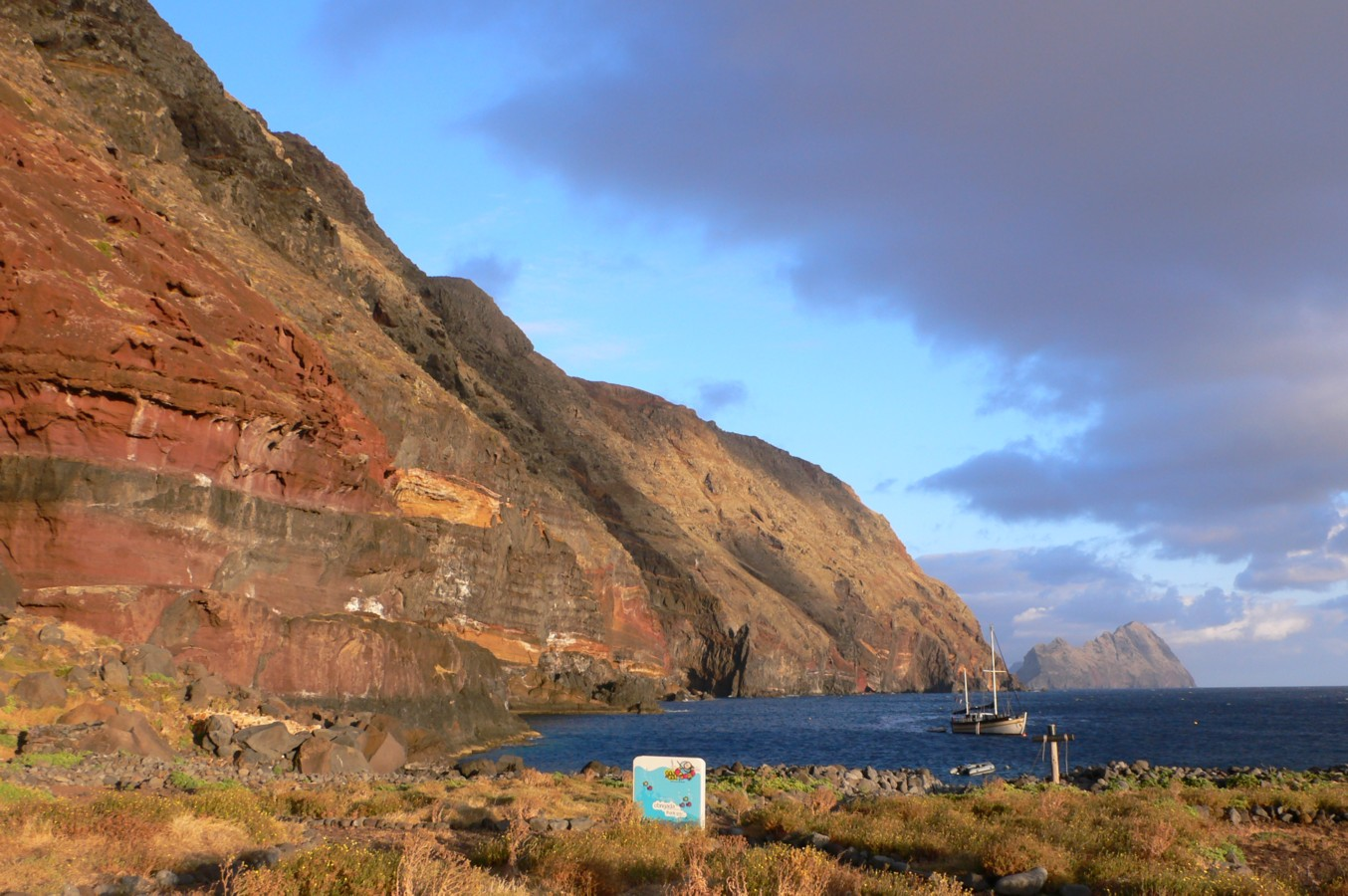
West coast of Deserta Grande Island, from nature reserve base.

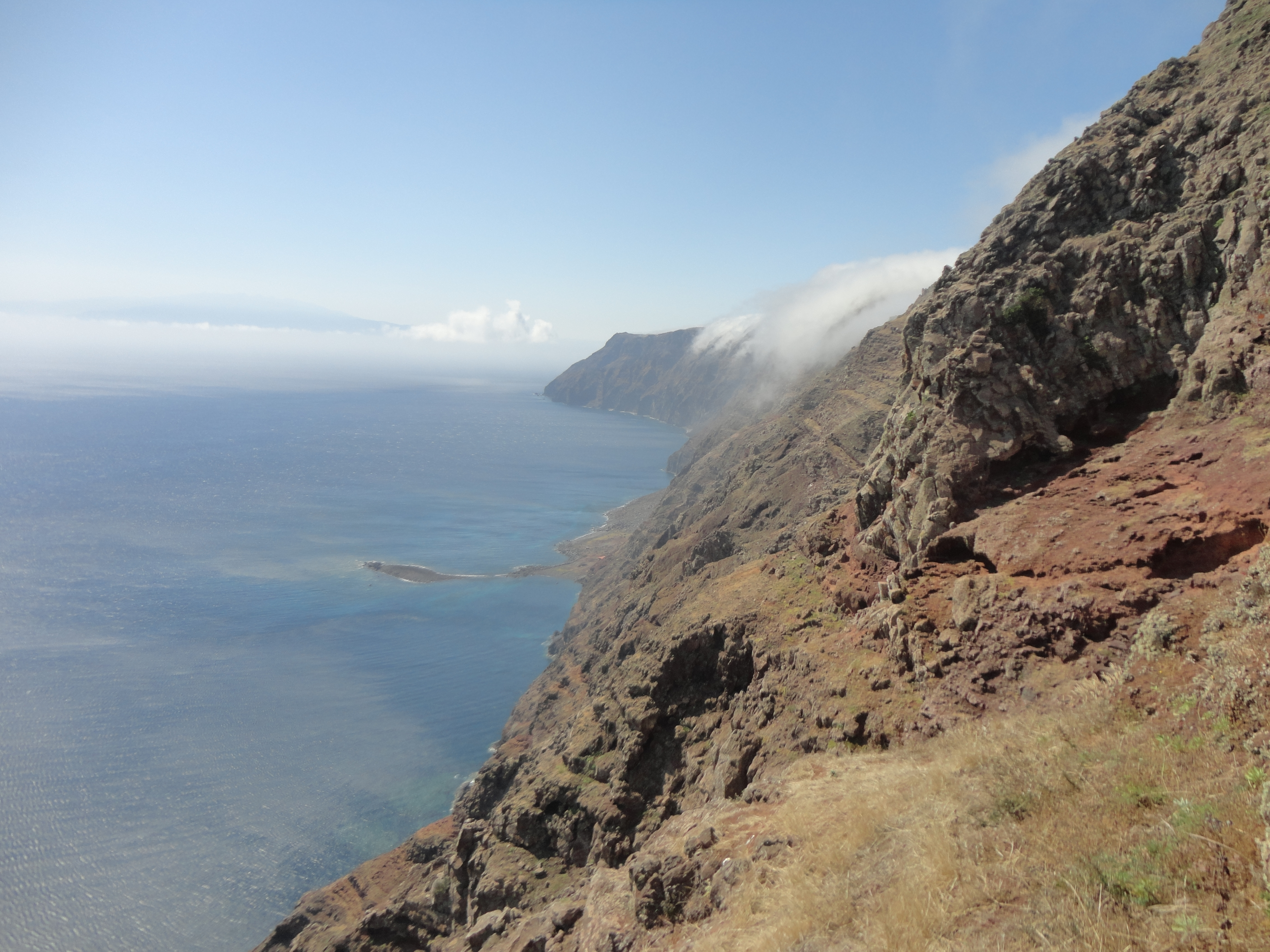
West coast of Deserta Grande Island

The Deserta Grande Island is the main island of the Desertas Islands archipelago, a small chain of three islands in the Portuguese Madeira Islands Archipelago of Macaronesia.

It is located 23 kilometres (14 mi) southeast of Madeira Island, off the western coast of North Africa in the Atlantic Ocean.

== Nature reserve ==
The island is part of the Desertas Islands nature reserve, with a warden's base midway along the western coast.

South of the base, no approach to the island closer than 100 m is permitted in order to protect the critically endangered Mediterranean monk seal breeding population. Access is permitted to the north of the nature base. Some activities, such as line and spear fishing, are banned.

The large, critically endangered wolf spider Hogna ingens is endemic to Deserta Grande.

The island has breeding Cory's shearwaters, Bulwer's petrels and Madeiran storm-petrels.

Two species of Madeiran land snail are endemic to Deserta Grande: Discula lyelliana and Geomitra grabhami. They had not been observed for over a century, and were presumed extinct by the early 21st century. However, during conservation expeditions conducted between 2012 and 2017, experts from the Institute for Nature Conservation and Forests rediscovered small populations of the two snail species, each with fewer than 200 individuals. These snails were transferred to zoos in the UK and France and successfully bred in captivity. In 2024, more than 1300 of them were reintroduced to the wild on nearby Bugio Island.

== See also ==
- Bugio Island
- Ilhéu Chão — Chão islet.
