= Geomitra grabhami =

Conservation status
- Critically Endangered (IUCN 3.1)

Scientific classification
- Kingdom: Animalia
- Phylum: Mollusca
- Class: Gastropoda
- Order: Stylommatophora
- Family: Geomitridae
- Genus: Geomitra
- Species: G. grabhami

Binomial name
- Geomitra grabhami (Wollaston, 1878)

Synonyms
- Helix Grabhami Wollaston, 1878

Species of gastropod

Geomitra grabhami is a species of air-breathing land snail, terrestrial pulmonate gastropod mollusks in the family Geomitridae.

Geomitra grabhami has been considered to be extinct, however live specimens were found in 2012. In 2021, conservationists from the Institute of Forests and Nature Conservation (IFCN) embarked on an expedition to locate extant populations of Geomitra grabhami and collect specimens for an ex-situ captive breeding program.

== Distribution ==
This species is endemic to Deserta Grande Island, Madeira, Portugal.
