= Ilhéu Chão =

Small Portuguese island in the Atlantic

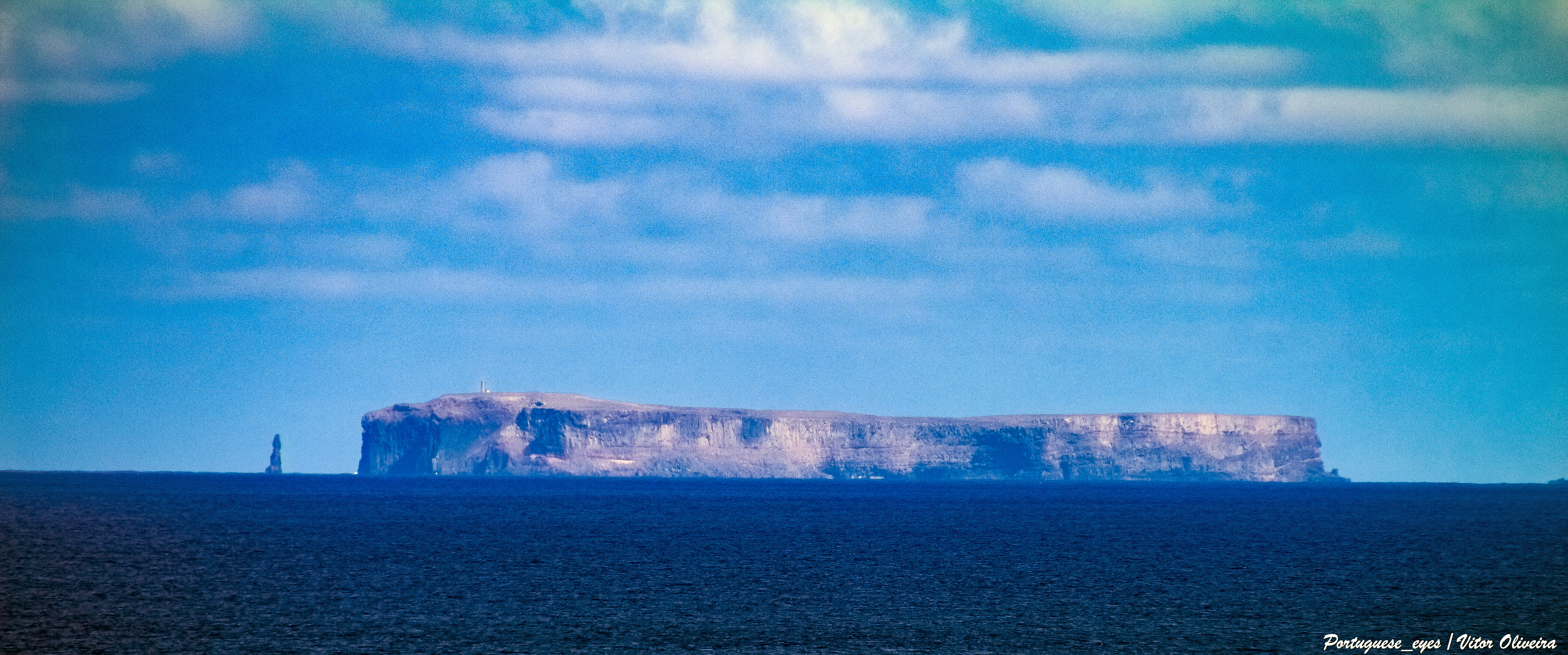
- Chão Islet seen from Madeira Island

- Location of Ilhéu Chão in the Madeira Islands Archipelago, Macaronesia.

- Location in the Atlantic Ocean

Geography
- Coordinates: 32°35′05″N 16°32′40″W
- Archipelago: Madeira
- Adjacent to: Atlantic Ocean
- Area: 1 km^{2} (0.39 sq mi)
- Length: 1.5 km (0.93 mi)
- Width: .48 km (0.298 mi)
- Highest elevation: 120 m (390 ft)

Administration
- Portugal
- Autonomous Region: Madeira
- Municipality: Santa Cruz
- Freguesia: Santa Cruz

Demographics
- Population: 0 (2021)

Additional information
- Time zone: WET (UTC±00:00)
  - Summer (DST): WEST (UTC+01:00)

Ilhéu Chão is a small islet within the Desertas Islands, a small chain of islands which are in turn within the Madeira archipelago. Chão is located to the southeast of Madeira Island.

The island is approximately 1.5 kilometres (0.93 miles) long by 480 metres (1,570 ft) wide. It has steep cliffs at the shore line and a very flat top formed by lava flows. The average height of the plateau is 100 metres. A narrow channel, 500 metres, separates it from Deserta Grande Island.

There is no fresh water on the island. Attempts to dry farm the island were unsuccessful. There are two structures on the island, a 14-metre-tall (46 ft) lighthouse on the northern end, and a one-story building about 600 metres (2,000 ft) south of it.

== Ecology ==
There are no rabbits on Ilhéu Chão, unlike Madeira Island and Deserta Grande Island. Two dominant plant species, the succulent Mesembryanthemum crystallinum and the alkali seepweed Suaeda vera, are left over from cultivation in the nineteenth century where they were grown to be burned for soda ash manufacture.
