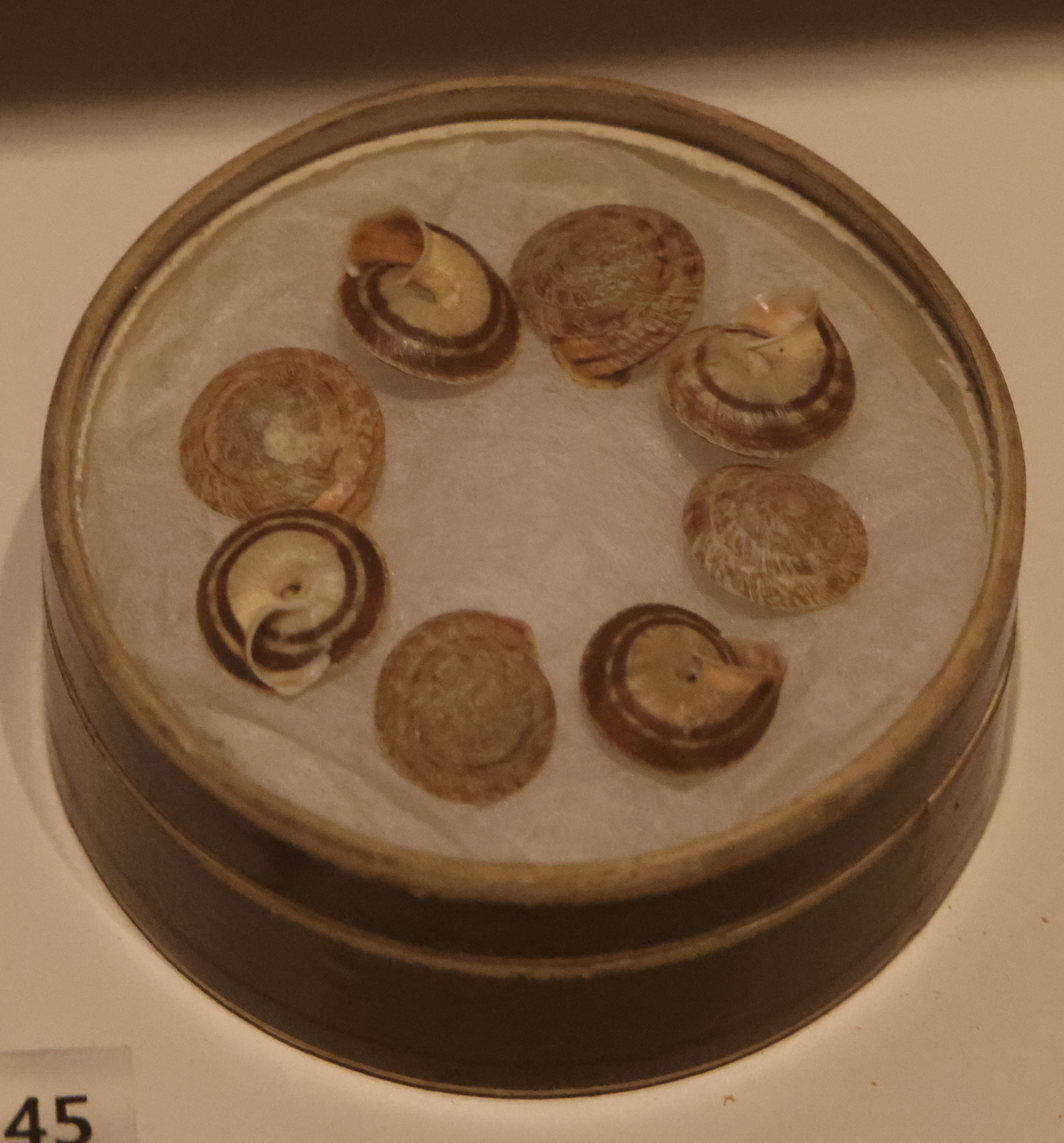
- Discula lyelliana shells, from the Royal Albert Memorial Museum.

Conservation status
- Critically endangered, possibly extinct (IUCN 3.1)

Scientific classification
- Kingdom: Animalia
- Phylum: Mollusca
- Class: Gastropoda
- Order: Stylommatophora
- Family: Geomitridae
- Genus: Discula
- Species: D. lyelliana

Binomial name
- Discula lyelliana (R. T. Lowe, 1852)

= Discula lyelliana =

Species of gastropod

Discula lyelliana is a species of air-breathing land snail, a terrestrial pulmonate gastropod mollusk in the family Geomitridae.

Discula lyelliana was listed as critically endangered possibly extinct in the 2011 IUCN Red List, before it was rediscovered, and is now part of a breeding and reintroduction programme.

== Distribution ==
This species is endemic to Deserta Grande Island, Madeira.
