= Bugio Island =

Island in Madeira, Portugal

Coordinates: 32°25′35″N 16°29′10″W

Location of Bugio Island in Macaronesia

Bugio Island (Portuguese: Ilha do Bugio) — is one of the three islands of the Portuguese Desertas Islands archipelago, a small chain of islands in the Madeira Islands Archipelago of Macaronesia.

It is located in the Atlantic Ocean off the western coast of North Africa, and to the southeast of Madeira Island.

The island is part of the Desertas Islands nature reserve, with no approach to the island closer than 100 m without a permit.

The island has breeding Desertas petrels.

== See also ==
- Deserta Grande Island
- Ilhéu Chão — Chão islet.
