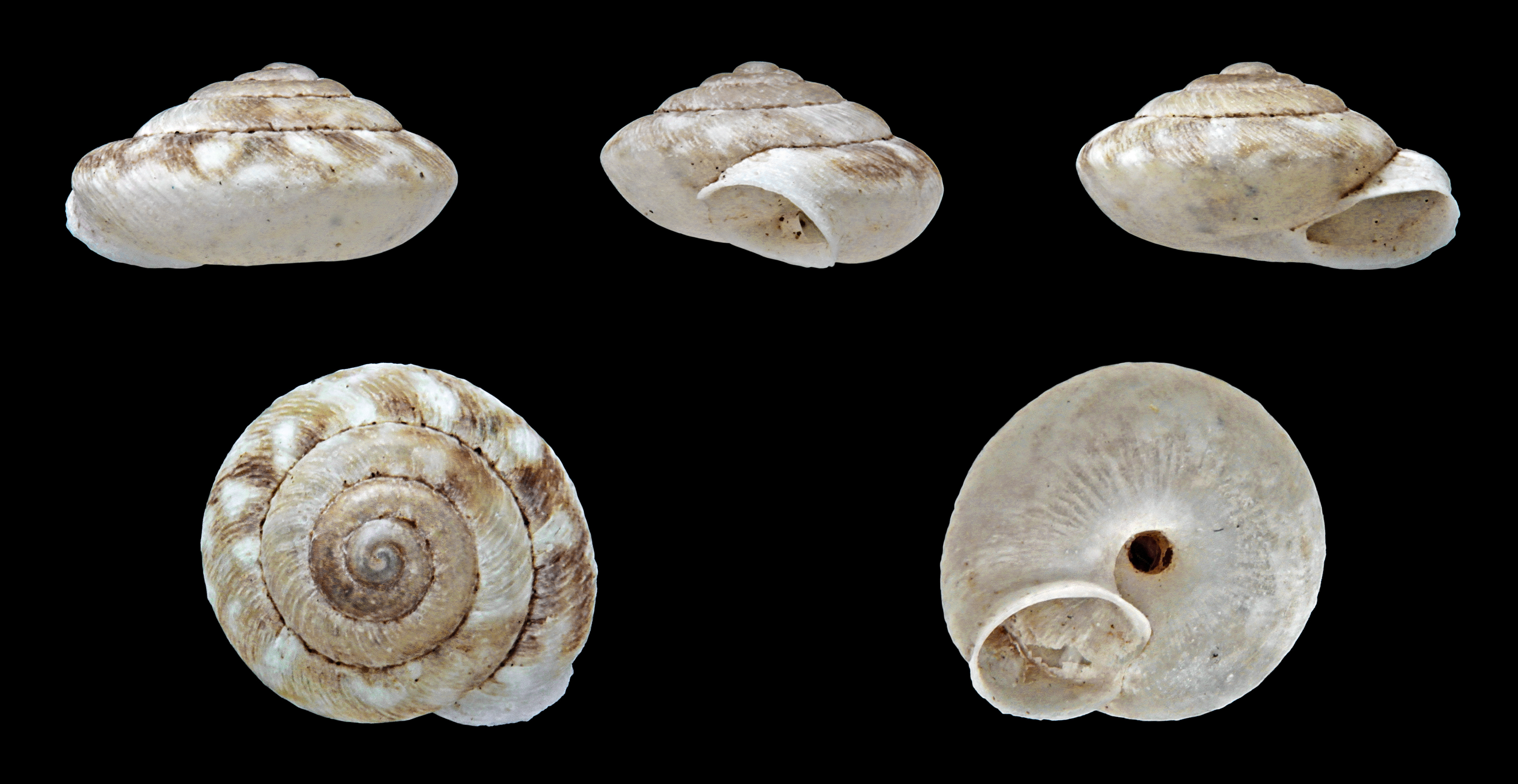
- Shell of Actinella lentiginosa stellaris

Scientific classification
- Kingdom: Animalia
- Phylum: Mollusca
- Class: Gastropoda
- Order: Stylommatophora
- Infraorder: Helicoidei
- Superfamily: Helicoidea
- Family: Geomitridae
- Genus: Actinella; Lowe, 1852

Type species
- Helix stellaris R. T. Lowe, 1852

Synonyms
- Actinella (Actinella) R. T. Lowe, 1852 · alternate representation; Actinella (Faustella) Mandahl-Barth, 1950; Actinella (Hispidella) R. T. Lowe, 1852 · alternate representation; Faustella Mandahl-Barth, 1950; Helix (Actinella) R. T. Lowe, 1852; Helix (Hispidella) R. T. Lowe, 1852 (basionym); Helix (Rimula) R. T. Lowe, 1852 (invalid; preoccupied); Rimula R. T. Lowe, 1852 (invalid; preoccupied)

= Actinella =

Genus of gastropods

Actinella is a genus of land snails in the family Geomitridae.

== Species ==
Species include:

- Actinella actinophora (R. T. Lowe, 1831)
- † Actinella arcinella (R. T. Lowe, 1855)
- Actinella arcta (R. T. Lowe, 1831)
- Actinella armitageana (R. T. Lowe, 1852)
- Actinella arridens (R. T. Lowe, 1831)
- Actinella carinofausta Waldén, 1983
- † Actinella crassiuscula (Cockerell, 1922)
- † Actinella descendens (Wollaston, 1878)
- Actinella fausta (R. T. Lowe, 1831)
- † Actinella fecundaerrata Groh & Cameron, 2019
- Actinella laciniosa (R. T. Lowe, 1852)
- Actinella lentiginosa (R. T. Lowe, 1831)
- † Actinella morenensis Seddon, 1990
- Actinella obserata (R. T. Lowe, 1852)
- † Actinella papillosculpta Waldén, 1983
- † Actinella promontoriensis Waldén, 1983
- Actinella robusta (Wollaston, 1878)

Synonyms

- Actinella anaglyptica (Reeve, 1852): synonym of Plebecula anaglyptica (Reeve, 1852) (superseded generic combination)
- Actinella giramica R. T. Lowe, 1852) : synonym of Plebecula giramica (R. T. Lowe, 1852) (superseded combination)
- Actinella littorinella (J. Mabille, 1883): synonym of Domunculifex littorinella (Mabille, 1883) (superseded generic combination)
- Actinella nitidiuscula (G. B. Sowerby I, 1824): synonym of Plebecula nitidiuscula (G. B. Sowerby I, 1824) (superseded combination)
- † Actinella saxipotens (Wollaston, 1878): synonym of † Plebecula saxipotens (Wollaston, 1878) (superseded combination)
