= Actinella obserata =

Conservation status
- Critically Endangered (IUCN 3.1)

Scientific classification
- Kingdom: Animalia
- Phylum: Mollusca
- Class: Gastropoda
- Order: Stylommatophora
- Family: Geomitridae
- Genus: Actinella
- Species: A. obserata

Binomial name
- Actinella obserata (R. T. Lowe, 1852)

Species of gastropod

Actinella obserata is a species of air-breathing land snail, a terrestrial pulmonate gastropod mollusk in the family Geometridae. This species is endemic to Madeira, Portugal.
