= Lemniscia michaudi =

Conservation status
- Near Threatened (IUCN 3.1)

Scientific classification
- Kingdom: Animalia
- Phylum: Mollusca
- Class: Gastropoda
- Order: Stylommatophora
- Family: Geomitridae
- Genus: Lemniscia
- Species: L. michaudi

Binomial name
- Lemniscia michaudi (Deshayes, 1830)

Species of gastropod

Lemniscia michaudi is a species of air-breathing land snail, a terrestrial pulmonate gastropod mollusc in the family Hygromiidae, the hairy snails and their allies.

This species is endemic to Porto Santo Island, Portugal. Its natural habitat is temperate grassland. It is threatened by habitat loss.
