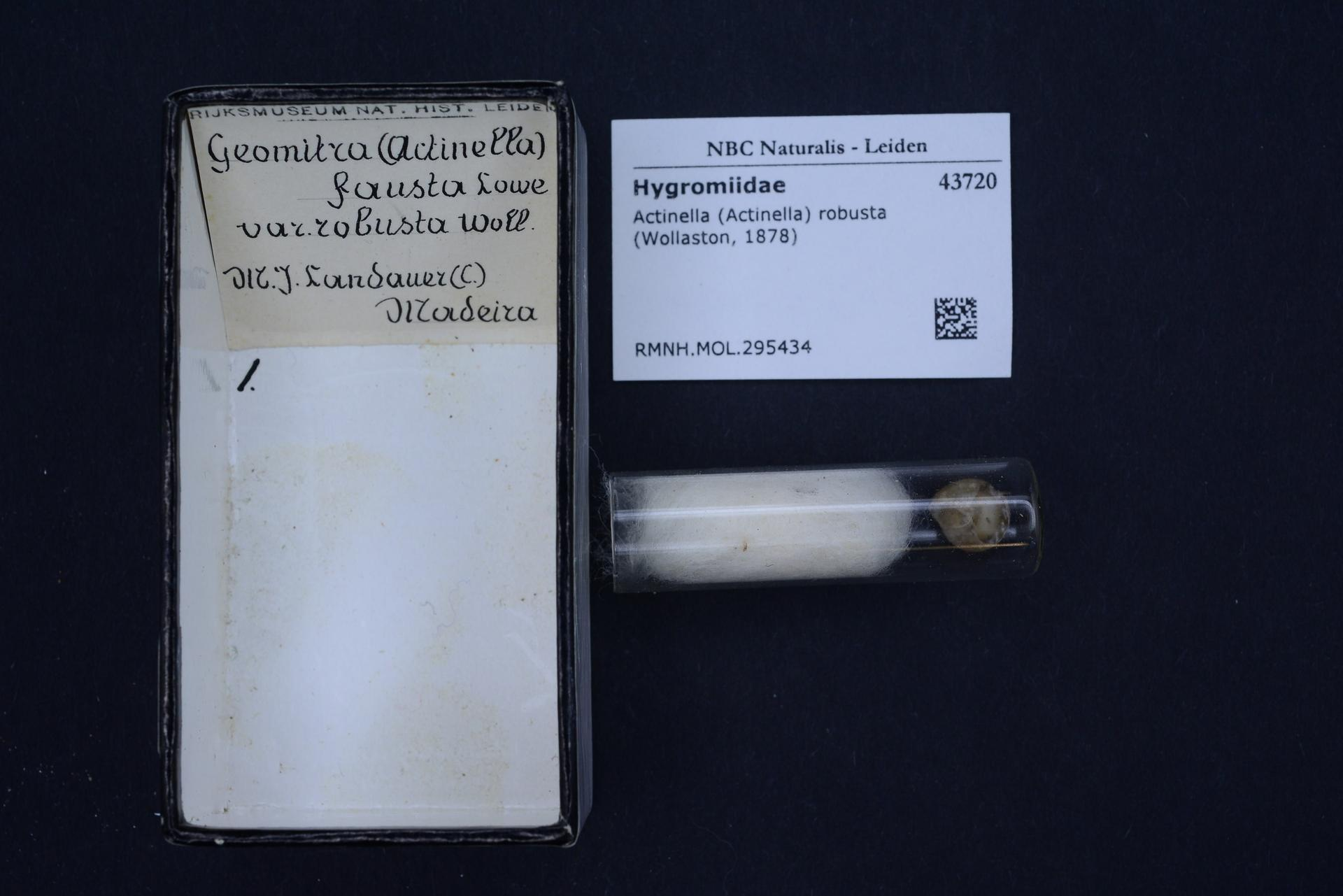

Conservation status
- Data Deficient (IUCN 3.1)

Scientific classification
- Kingdom: Animalia
- Phylum: Mollusca
- Class: Gastropoda
- Order: Stylommatophora
- Family: Geomitridae
- Genus: Actinella
- Species: A. robusta

Binomial name
- Actinella robusta Hustedt, 1952

= Actinella robusta =

Species of gastropod

Actinella robusta is a species of air-breathing land snail, a terrestrial pulmonate gastropod mollusc in the family Geometridae. This species is endemic to Portugal.
