= Wollastonia =

Wollastonia is the scientific name of several genera of organisms and may refer to:

- Wollastonia (beetle) Heer in Heer & Escher, 1852, a prehistoric genus of beetles in the family Hydrophilidae
- Wollastonia (gastropod) De Mattia, Neiber & Groh, 2018, a genus of gastropods in the family Geomitridae
- Wollastonia (plant), a genus of plants in the family Asteraceae
