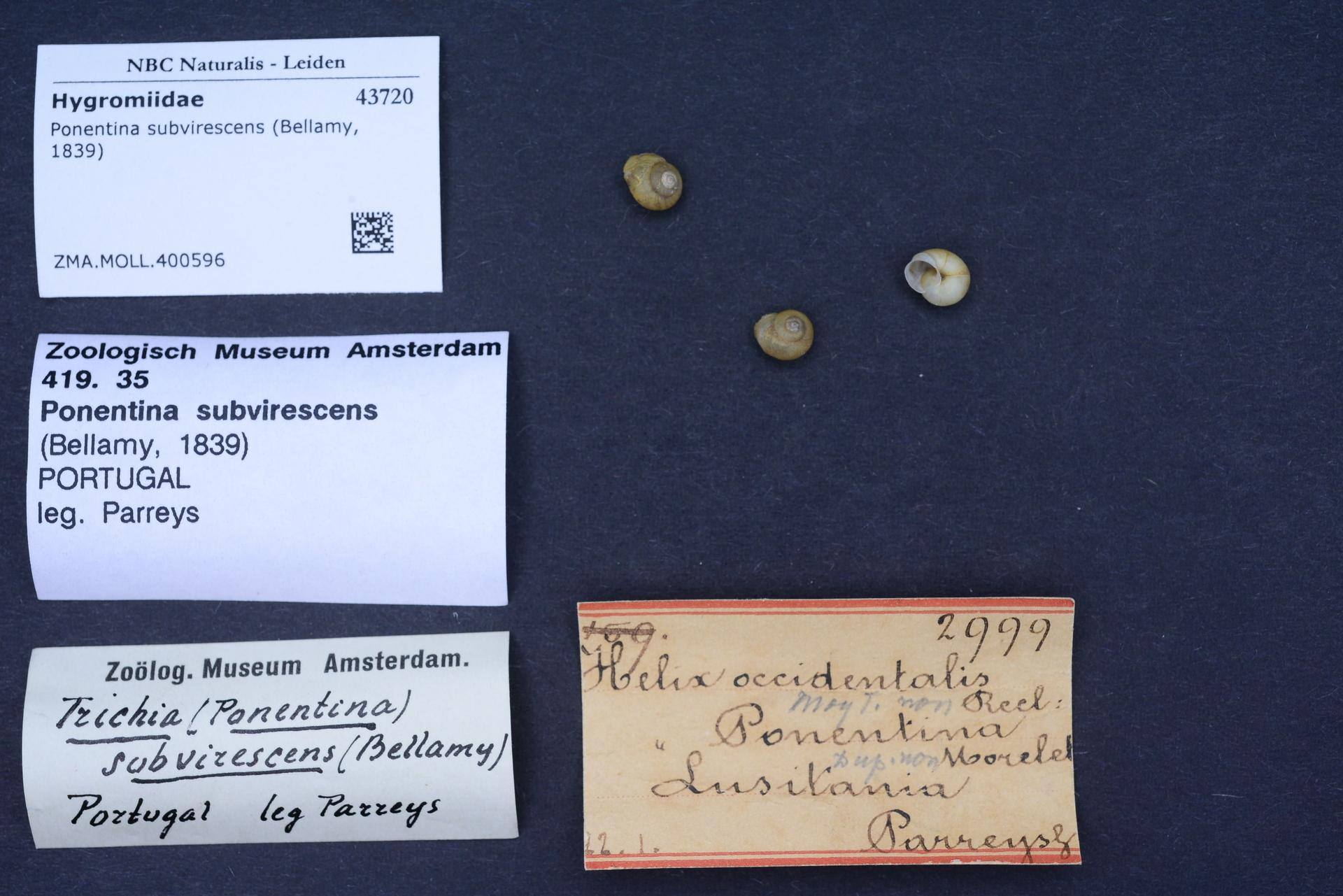

Scientific classification
- Domain: Eukaryota
- Kingdom: Animalia
- Phylum: Mollusca
- Class: Gastropoda
- Order: Stylommatophora
- Family: Geomitridae
- Genus: Ponentina
- Species: P. subvirescens

Binomial name
- Ponentina subvirescens (Bellamy, 1839)

= Ponentina subvirescens =

Species of gastropod

Ponentina subvirescens is a species of small air-breathing land snail, a terrestrial pulmonate gastropod mollusc in the family Geomitridae.

== Distribution ==
This species is known to occur in a number of countries and islands including:

- Great Britain
- Channel Islands
- France
- Spain
