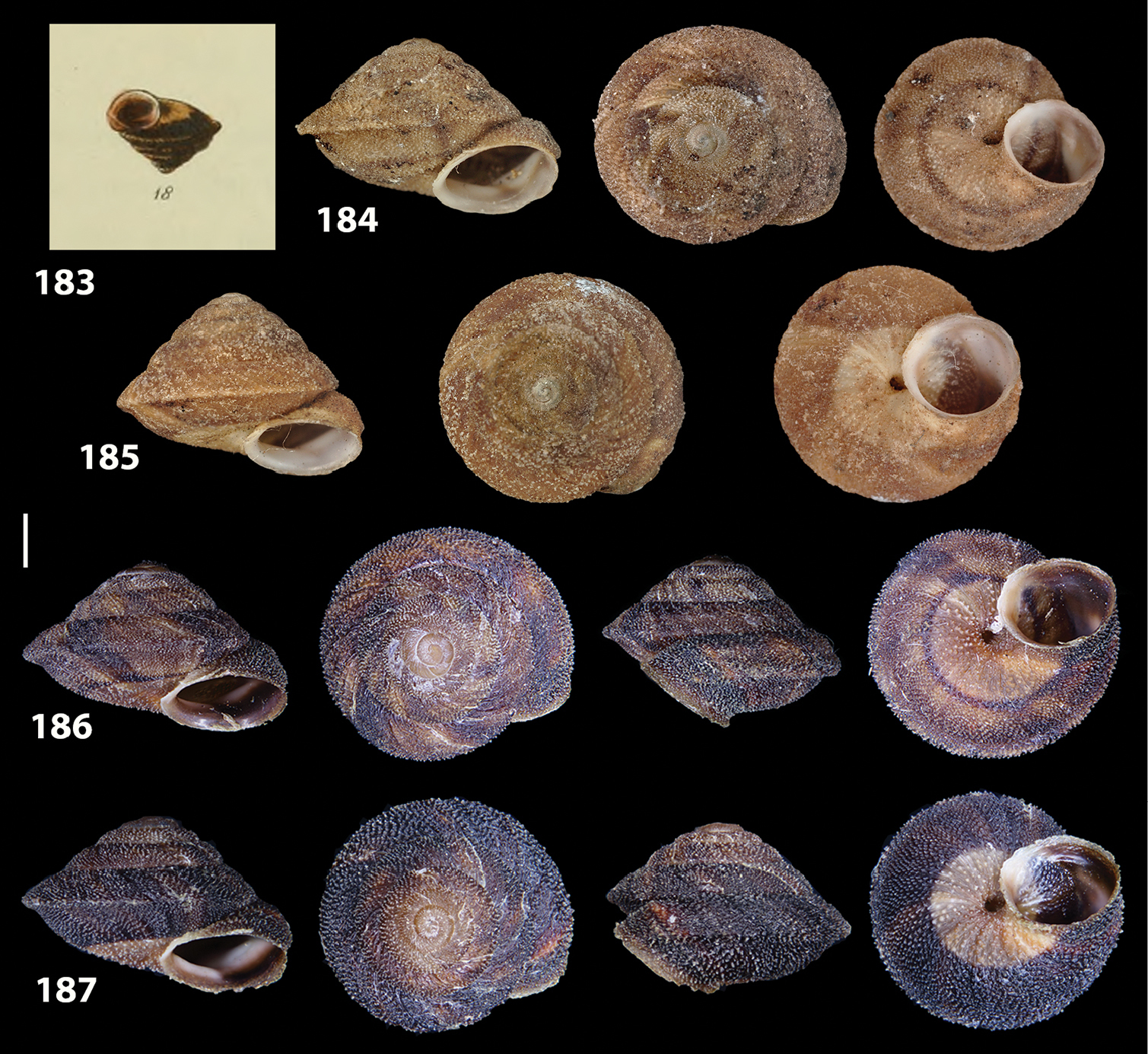
- Shell of Wollastonaria oxytropis

Conservation status
- Near Threatened (IUCN 3.1)

Scientific classification
- Kingdom: Animalia
- Phylum: Mollusca
- Class: Gastropoda
- Order: Stylommatophora
- Family: Geomitridae
- Genus: Wollastonaria
- Species: W. oxytropis

Binomial name
- Wollastonaria oxytropis (Lowe, 1831)

Synonyms
- Discula oxytropis; Helix (Helicella) oxytropis R. T. Lowe, 1831; Helix (Hystricella) oxytropis R. T. Lowe, 1831; Helix (Hystricella) oxytropis var. subcarinulata Wollaston, 1878; Hystricella oxytropis (R. T. Lowe, 1831) · (superseded generic combination); Hystricella oxytropis oxytropis (R. T. Lowe, 1831) · unaccepted (superseded generic combination); Wollastonia oxytropis (R. T. Lowe, 1831)

= Wollastonaria oxytropis =

Species of gastropod

Wollastonaria oxytropis is a species of air-breathing land snail, a terrestrial pulmonate gastropod mollusk in the family Geomitridae, the hairy snails and their allies.

This species is endemic to Madeira, Portugal.
