= Actinella carinofausta =

Conservation status
- Endangered (IUCN 3.1)

Scientific classification
- Kingdom: Animalia
- Phylum: Mollusca
- Class: Gastropoda
- Order: Stylommatophora
- Family: Geomitridae
- Genus: Actinella
- Species: A. carinofausta

Binomial name
- Actinella carinofausta Waldén, 1983

Species of gastropod

Actinella carinofausta is a species of air-breathing land snail, a terrestrial pulmonate gastropod mollusk in the family Geomitridae. This species is endemic to Madeira, Portugal.
