= Disculella spirulina =

Conservation status
- Vulnerable (IUCN 3.1)

Scientific classification
- Kingdom: Animalia
- Phylum: Mollusca
- Class: Gastropoda
- Order: Stylommatophora
- Family: Geomitridae
- Genus: Disculella
- Species: D. spirulina

Binomial name
- Disculella spirulina (Cockerell, 1921)

Synonyms
- Geomitra (Disculella) spirulina T. D. A. Cockerell, 1921 (basionym); Helix (Placentula) spirorbis R. T. Lowe, 1852; Ochthephila spirulina (Cockerell, 1921)

Species of gastropod

Disculella spirulina is a species of gastropod in the Geomitridae family.

It is endemic to the island Madeira, Portugal. Its natural habitat is temperate grassland. It is threatened by habitat loss.
