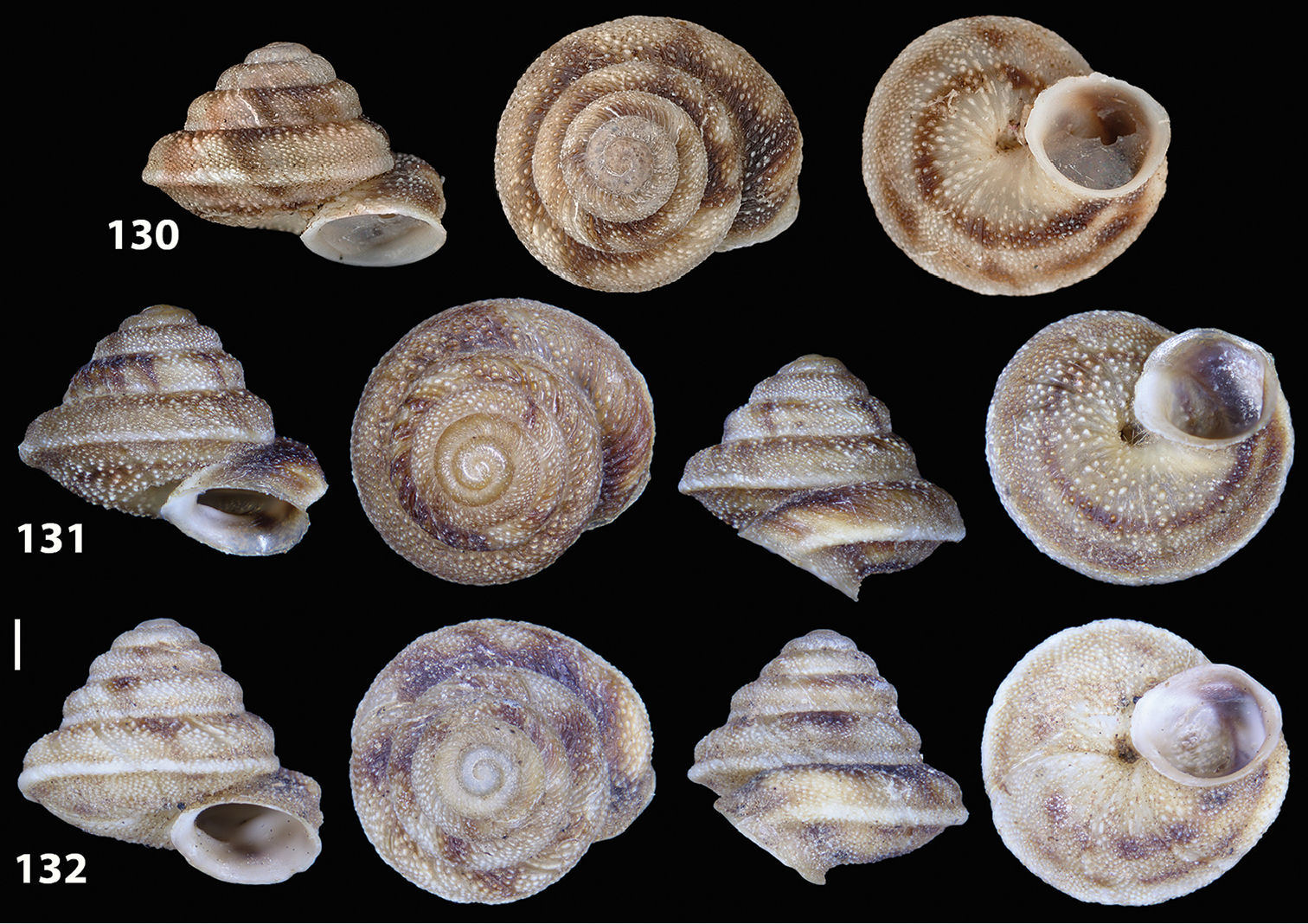
- Shells of Wollastonaria leacockiana

Conservation status
- Vulnerable (IUCN 2.3)

Scientific classification
- Kingdom: Animalia
- Phylum: Mollusca
- Class: Gastropoda
- Order: Stylommatophora
- Family: Geomitridae
- Genus: Wollastonaria
- Species: W. leacockiana

Binomial name
- Wollastonaria leacockiana (Wollaston, 1878)

Synonyms
- Helix leacockiana Wollaston, 1878 (original combination); Hystricella leacockiana (Wollaston, 1878) (superseded generic combination); Wollastonia leacockiana (Wollaston, 1878) superseded combination

= Wollastonaria leacockiana =

Species of gastropod

Wollastonaria leacockiana is a species of small land snail, a terrestrial pulmonate gastropod mollusk in the family Geomitridae.

== Description ==
(Original description in Latin) The shell is top-shaped, flattened and perforated on the underside, and densely covered everywhere with blunt granules. It has a pale, slightly yellowish-brown color, which is marble-patterned here and there with irregular reddish-brown bands (especially underneath) and cloud-like blotches (especially above).

The spire is moderately elevated. The whorls are convex and double-keeled; on the body whorl—which is somewhat roof-shaped—the outer keel is extremely sharp and strongly projecting, while the inner keel is blunt, rounded, set back, and occasionally obsolete. The umbilicus is tiny and pinpoint-like. The aperture is suboval to rounded, with the lips continuous and joined together, and the peristome is simple, expanded, slightly recurved, thin, and raised.

== Distribution ==
This species occurs in Madeira.

== Conservation status ==
This species of snail is mentioned in annexes II and IV of the Habitats Directive.
