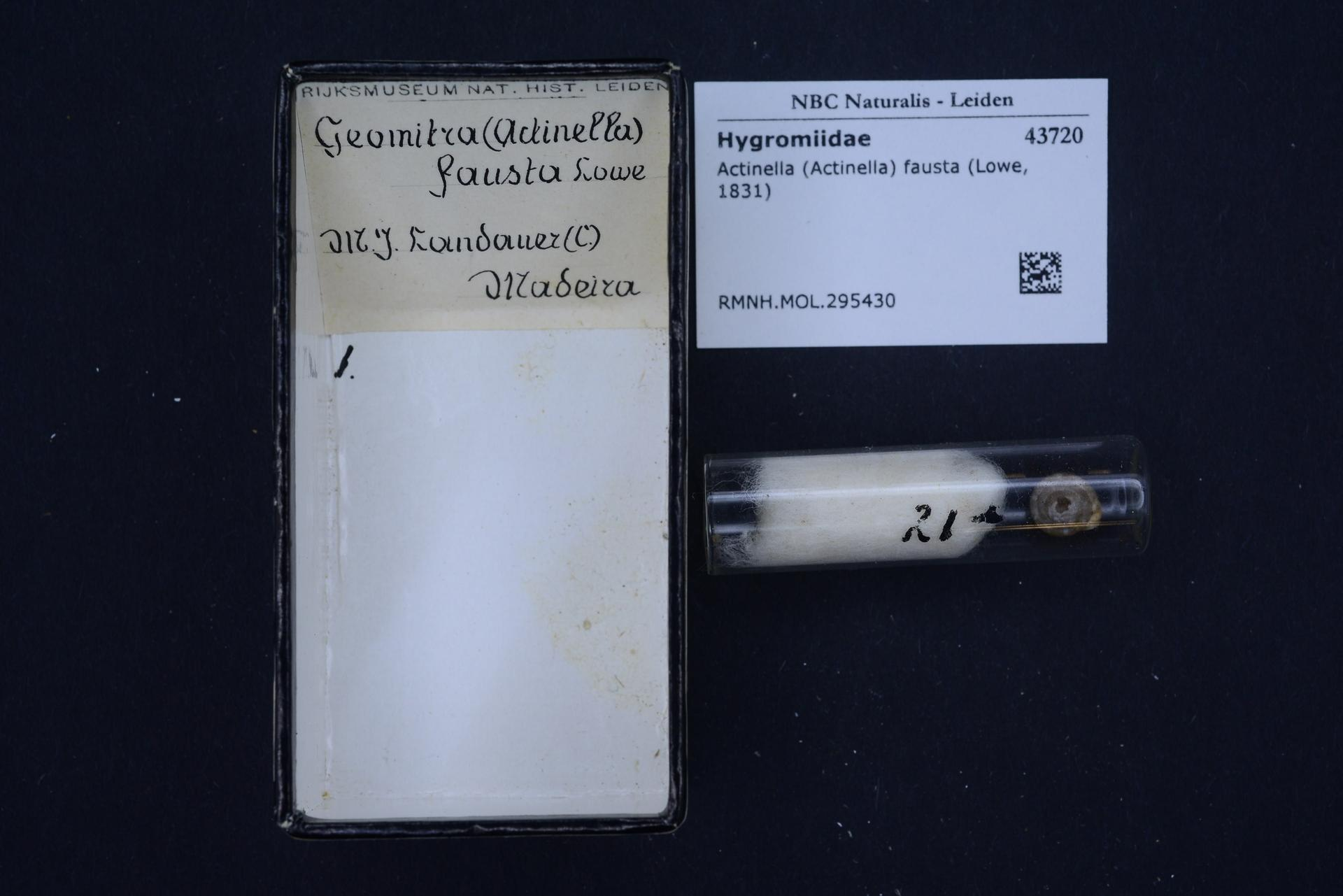
- Actinella fausta

Conservation status
- Least Concern (IUCN 3.1)

Scientific classification
- Kingdom: Animalia
- Phylum: Mollusca
- Class: Gastropoda
- Order: Stylommatophora
- Family: Geomitridae
- Genus: Actinella
- Species: A. fausta

Binomial name
- Actinella fausta (Lowe, 1831)

= Actinella fausta =

Species of gastropod

Actinella fausta is a species of land snail in the family Geomitridae. It is endemic to the main island of Madeira, part of Portugal. It is not common but it is widespread on the island, occurring in several coastal sites. It lives in coastal scrub habitat in gullies and valleys.
