= Spirorbula obtecta =

Conservation status
- Least Concern (IUCN 3.1)

Scientific classification
- Kingdom: Animalia
- Phylum: Mollusca
- Class: Gastropoda
- Order: Stylommatophora
- Family: Geomitridae
- Genus: Spirorbula
- Species: S. obtecta

Binomial name
- Spirorbula obtecta (Lowe, 1831)

Synonyms
- Helix (Helicella) obtecta R. T. Lowe, 1831

Species of gastropod

Spirorbula obtecta is a species of air-breathing land snail, a terrestrial pulmonate gastropod mollusk in the family Geomitridae, the hairy snails and their allies.

This species is endemic to Porto Santo Island, Madeira, Portugal.
