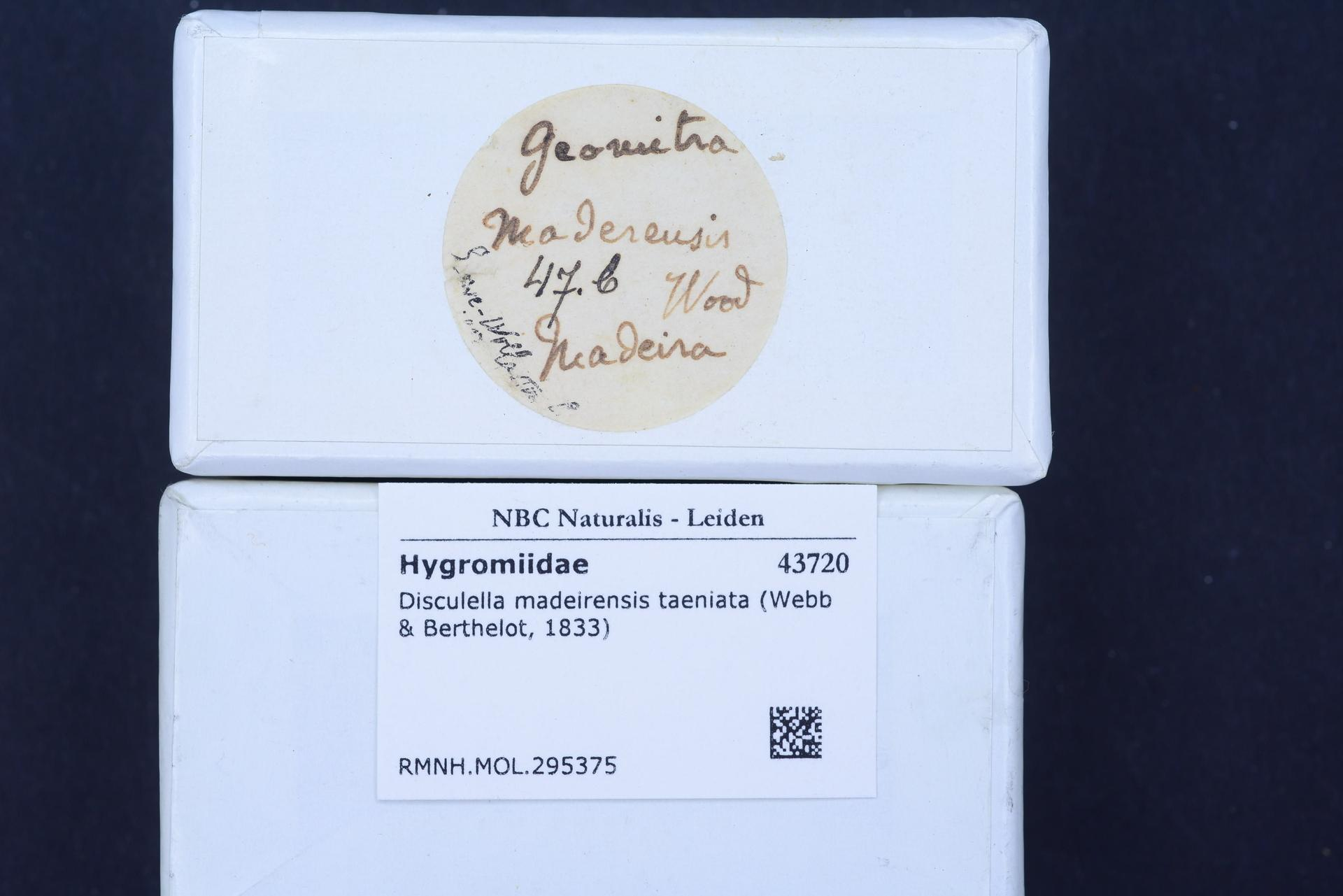
- Disculella madeirensis taeniata (Webb & Berthelot, 1833)

Conservation status
- Least Concern (IUCN 3.1)

Scientific classification
- Kingdom: Animalia
- Phylum: Mollusca
- Class: Gastropoda
- Order: Stylommatophora
- Family: Geomitridae
- Genus: Disculella
- Species: D. madeirensis

Binomial name
- Disculella madeirensis (Wood, 1828)

= Disculella madeirensis =

Species of gastropod

Disculella madeirensis is a species of air-breathing land snail, terrestrial pulmonate gastropod mollusc in the family Geomitridae, the hairy snails and their allies. This species is endemic to Madeira, Portugal.
