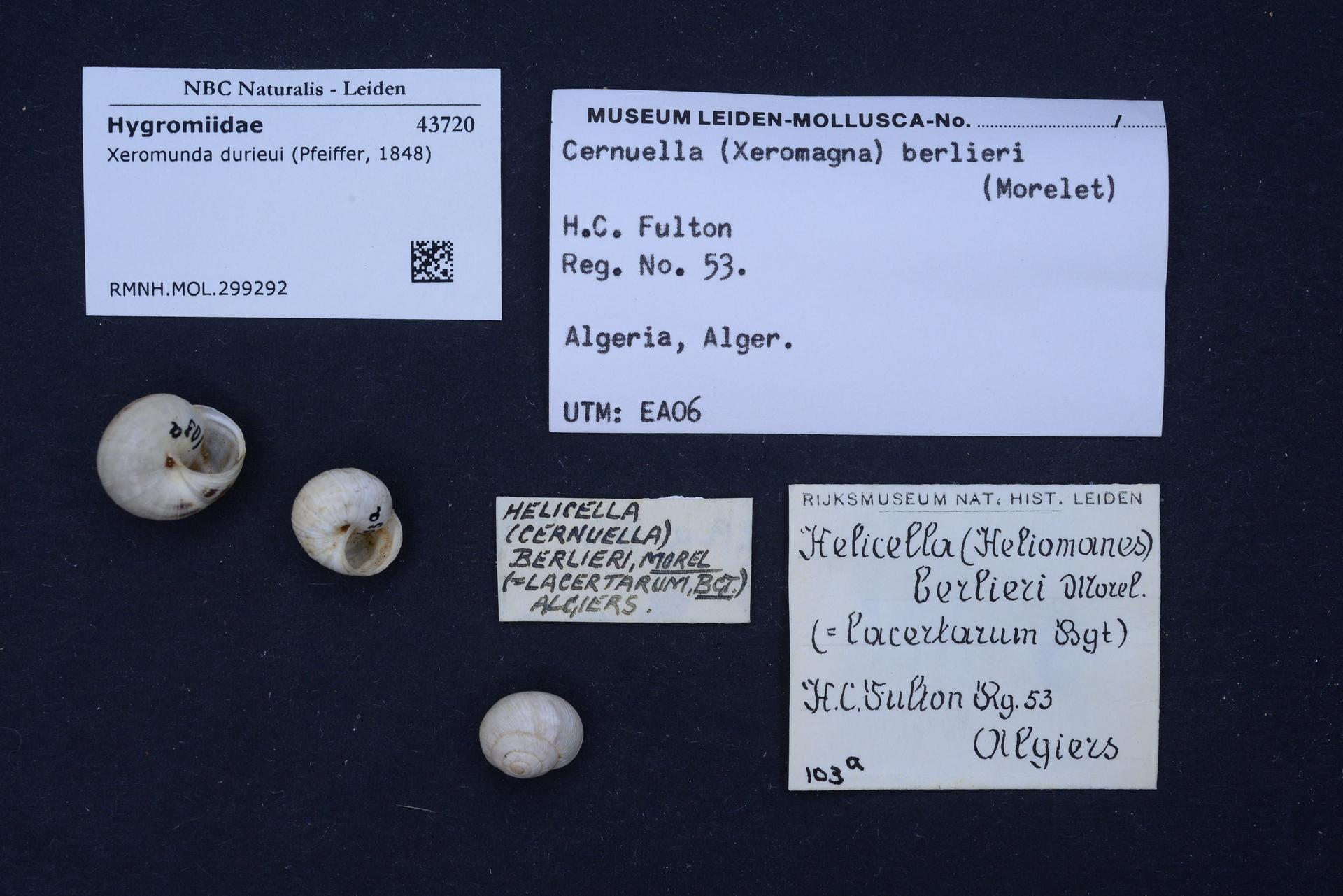
- Shell of Xeromunda durieui (specimen at Naturalis Biodiversity Center)
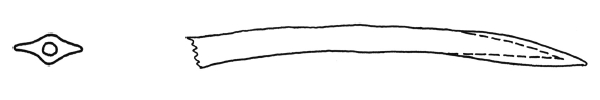
- Drawing of love dart of Xeromunda durieui. Cross-section (on the left) and lateral view (on the right)

Scientific classification
- Kingdom: Animalia
- Phylum: Mollusca
- Class: Gastropoda
- Order: Stylommatophora
- Family: Geomitridae
- Genus: Xeromunda
- Species: X. durieui

Binomial name
- Xeromunda durieui (Pfeiffer, 1848)

= Xeromunda durieui =

Species of gastropod

Xeromunda durieui is a species of small air-breathing land snail, a terrestrial pulmonate gastropod mollusk in the family Geomitridae, the hairy snails and their allies.

This species of snail makes and uses love darts as part of its mating behavior.

== Distribution ==
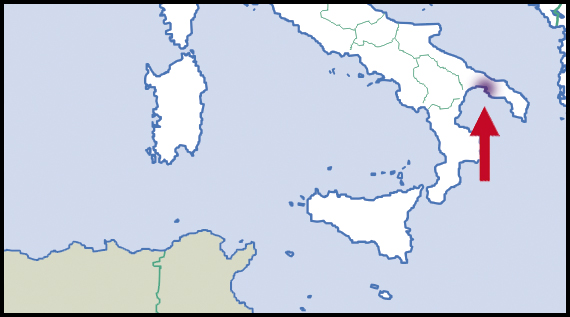
Distribution

This snail is native to south Italy, North Africa and possibly to Cyprus.
