= Spirorbula squalida =

Conservation status
- Vulnerable (IUCN 3.1)

Scientific classification
- Kingdom: Animalia
- Phylum: Mollusca
- Class: Gastropoda
- Order: Stylommatophora
- Family: Geomitridae
- Genus: Spirorbula
- Species: S. squalida

Binomial name
- Spirorbula squalida (R.T. Lowe, 1852)

Synonyms
- Helix (Irus) squalida R. T. Lowe, 1852 (basionym)

Species of gastropod

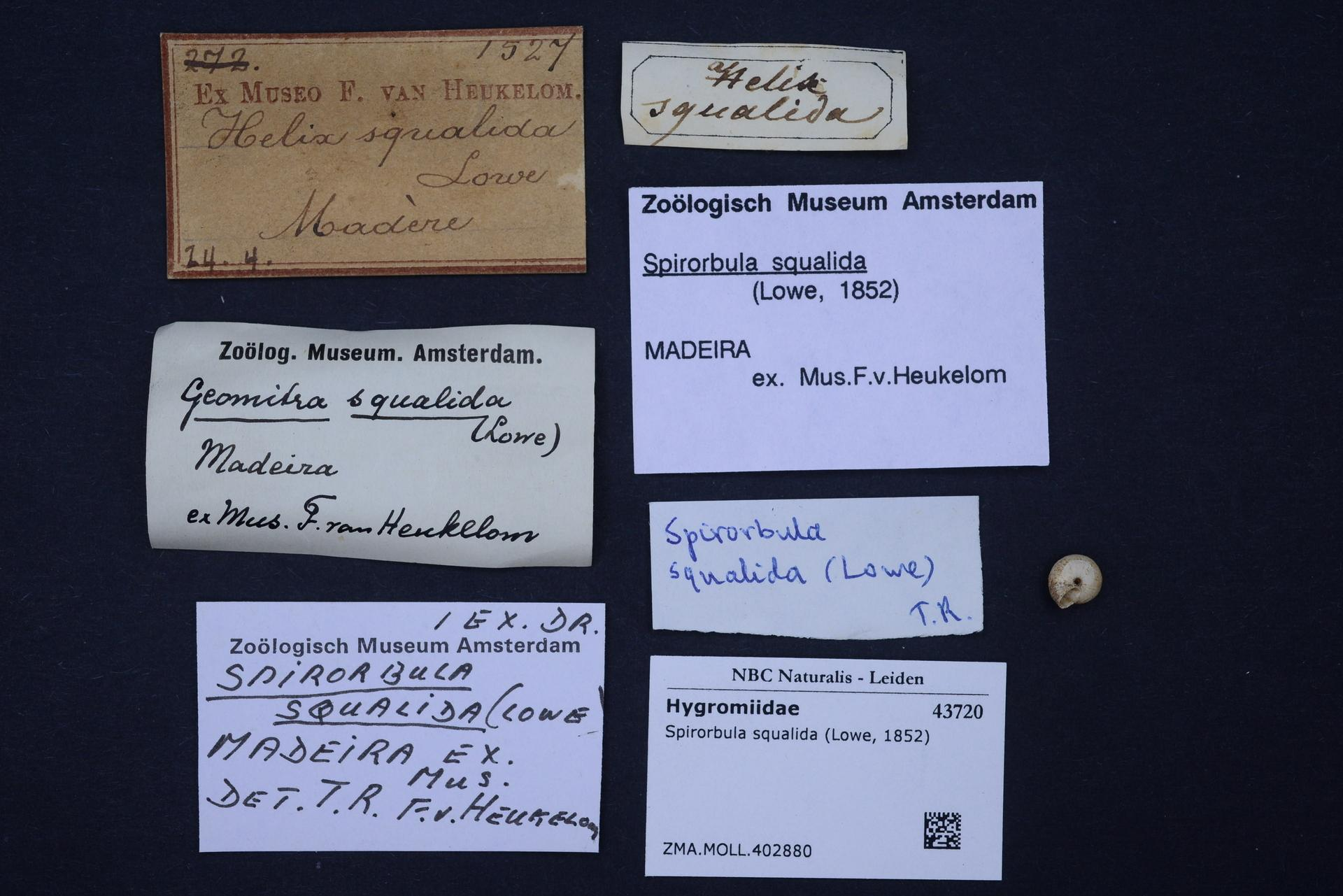

Spirorbula squalida is a species of air-breathing land snails, terrestrial pulmonate gastropod mollusks in the family Geomitridae, the hairy snails and their allies.

This species is endemic to Portugal. Its natural habitat is rocky areas; it is threatened by habitat loss.
