= Keraea garachicoensis =

Conservation status
- Extinct

Scientific classification
- Domain: Eukaryota
- Kingdom: Animalia
- Phylum: Mollusca
- Class: Gastropoda
- Order: Stylommatophora
- Family: Geomitridae
- Genus: Keraea
- Species: †K. garachicoensis

Binomial name
- †Keraea garachicoensis (Wollaston, 1878)

Extinct species of gastropod

Keraea garachicoensis is an extinct species of air-breathing land snail, a terrestrial pulmonate gastropod mollusc in the family Geomitridae.

Keraea garachicoensis is considered to be extinct.

== Distribution ==
This species was endemic to Tenerife, Canary Islands.
