= Lemniscia galeata =

Conservation status
- Critically Endangered (IUCN 3.1)

Scientific classification
- Kingdom: Animalia
- Phylum: Mollusca
- Class: Gastropoda
- Order: Stylommatophora
- Family: Geomitridae
- Genus: Lemniscia
- Species: L. galeata

Binomial name
- Lemniscia galeata (Lowe, 1862)

Synonyms
- Caseolus calvus galeatus (R. T. Lowe, 1862); Caseolus galeatus (R. T. Lowe, 1862); Helix calva galeata R. T. Lowe, 1862

Species of gastropod

Lemniscia galeata is a species of air-breathing land snail, a terrestrial pulmonate gastropod mollusc in the family Geomitridae, the hairy snails and their allies.

This species is endemic to Madeira, Portugal.
