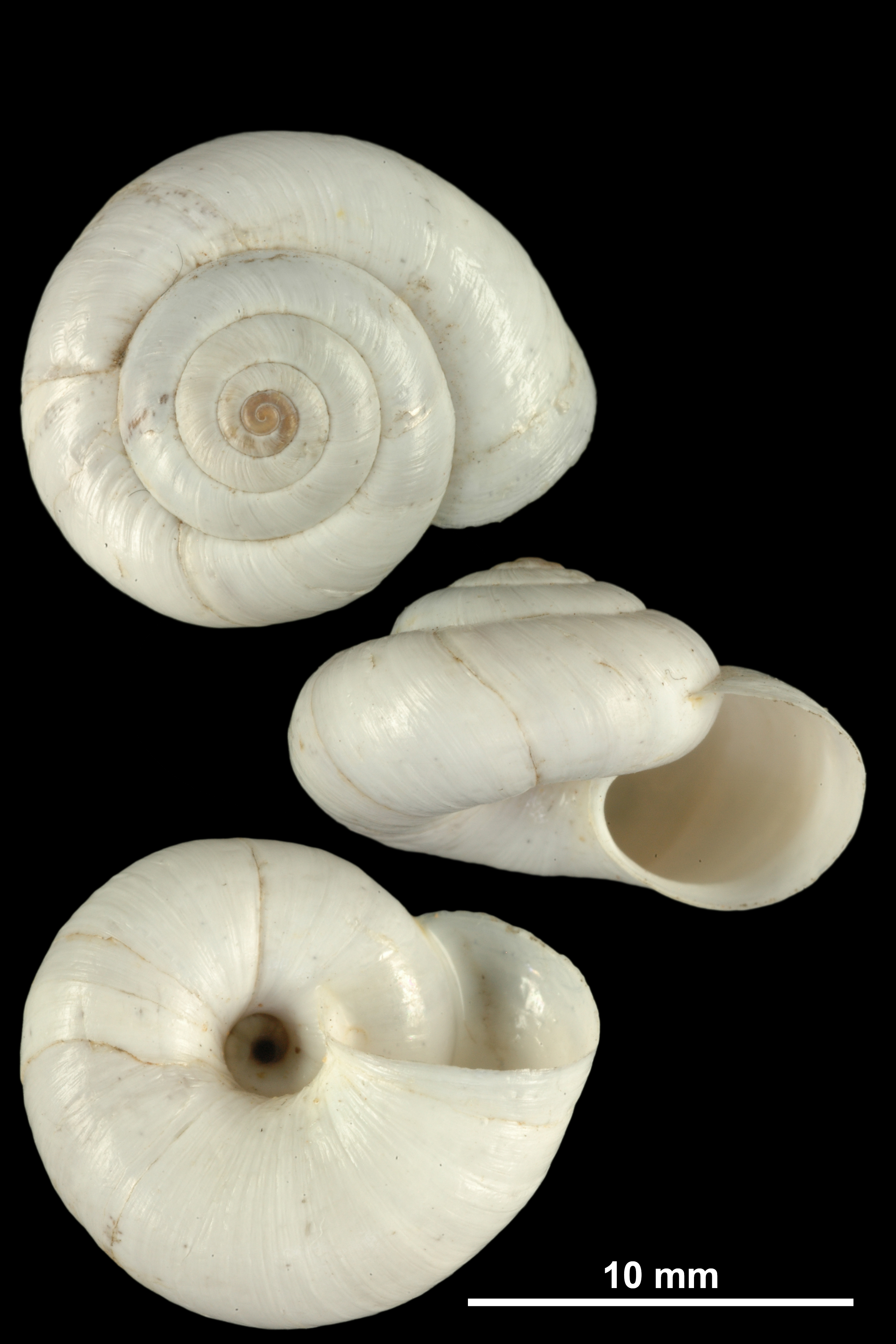

Scientific classification
- Domain: Eukaryota
- Kingdom: Animalia
- Phylum: Mollusca
- Class: Gastropoda
- Order: Stylommatophora
- Superfamily: Helicoidea
- Family: Geomitridae
- Genus: Xeropicta
- Species: X. derbentina

Binomial name
- Xeropicta derbentina (Krynicki, 1836

Synonyms
- Helix (Xerophila) derbentina (Krynicki, 1836) (unaccepted combination); Helix derbentina Krynicki, 1836 (original combination); Helix gyroides L. Pfeiffer, 1871 · unaccepted (junior synonym)

= Xeropicta derbentina =

Species of gastropod

Xeropicta derbentina is a species of gastropods belonging to the family Geomitridae.

== Distribution ==
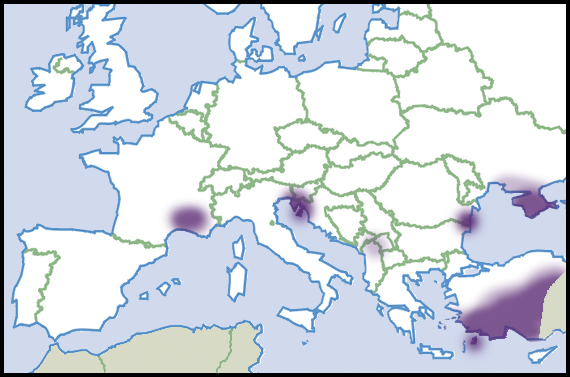
Distribution

The species is found around the Mediterranean and near Black Sea.
