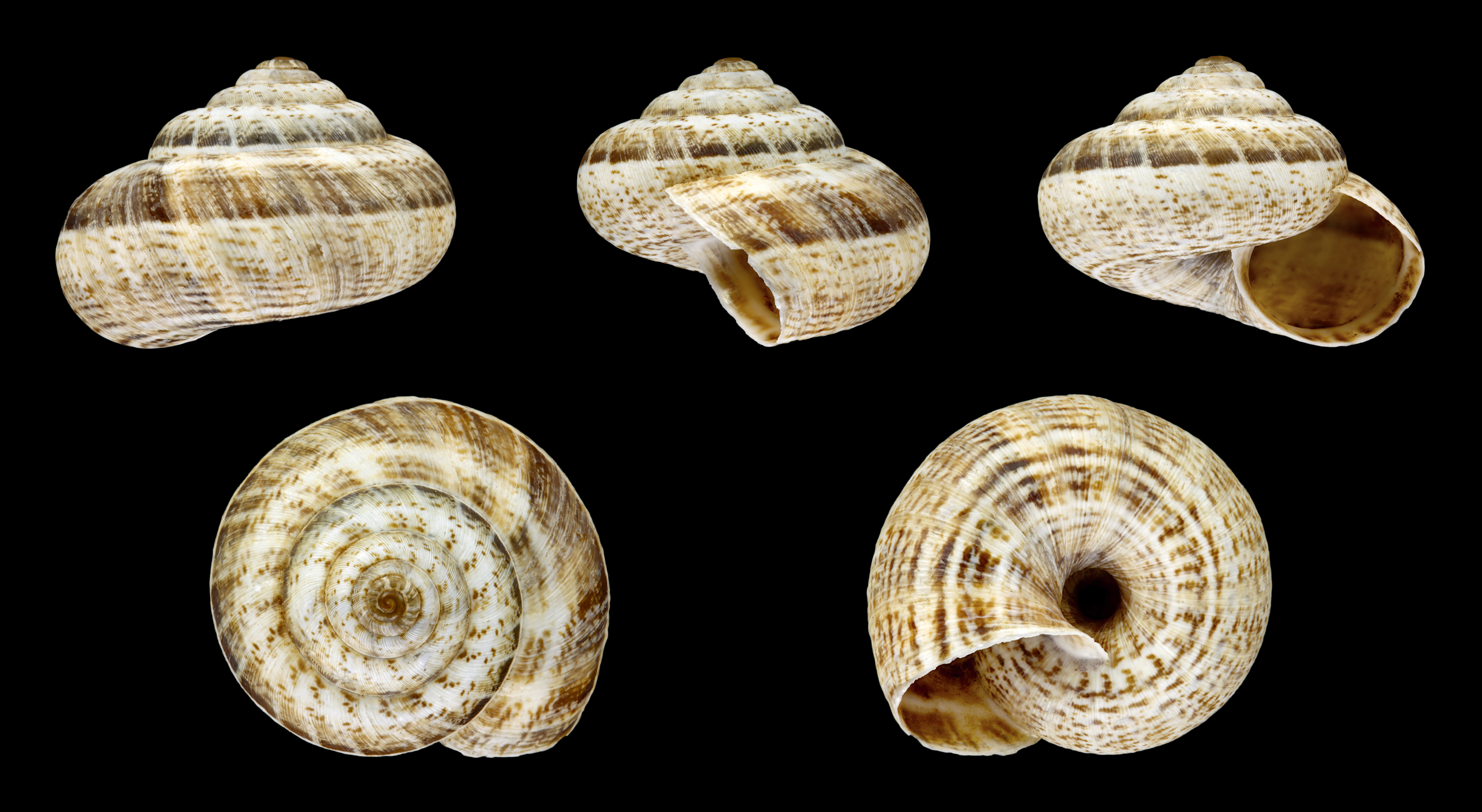

Scientific classification
- Domain: Eukaryota
- Kingdom: Animalia
- Phylum: Mollusca
- Class: Gastropoda
- Order: Stylommatophora
- Superfamily: Helicoidea
- Family: Geomitridae
- Genus: Xeropicta
- Species: X. krynickii

Binomial name
- Xeropicta krynickii (Krynicki, 1833)

Synonyms
- Helix (Xerophila) joppensis Schmidt, 1855; Helix (Xerophila) joppensis f. minor O. Boettger, 1883 · (junior synonym); Helix (Xerophila) joppensis var. subkrynickii Germain, 1921 · (unjustified emendation for Helix oppensis var. subkrynickiana); Helix (Xerophila) krynickii (Krynicki, 1833) · (superseded combination); Helix (Xerophila) vestalis L. Pfeiffer, 1841 ·; Helix (Xerophila) vestalis f. jerichontis Avnimelech, 1933 · (junior synonym); Helix (Xerophila) vestalis var. amorrhae Germain, 1921 · (junior synonym); Helix cretica var. littoralis Mousson, 1854 (junior synonym); Helix cyparissias L. Pfeiffer, 1847 (junior synonym); Helix joppensis Schmidt, 1855 (junior synonym); Helix joppensis var. multinota Mousson, 1861 (junior synonym); Helix joppensis var. subkrynickiana Mousson, 1861 (junior synonym); Helix krynickii Krynicki, 1833 (original combination); Helix larnacensis Rolle & Kobelt, 189· (junior synonym); Helix vestalis L. Pfeiffer, 1841 (junior synonym); Helix vestalis var. foveolata Westerlund, 1889 (junior synonym); Xerophila (Xeropicta) vestalis (L. Pfeiffer, 1841) ·; Xerophila (Xeropicta) vestalis var. laodicensis Pallary, 1939 (junior synnonym)

= Xeropicta krynickii =

Species of gastropod

Xeropicta krynickii is a terrestrial species of gastropods belonging to the family Geomitridae.

== Distribution ==
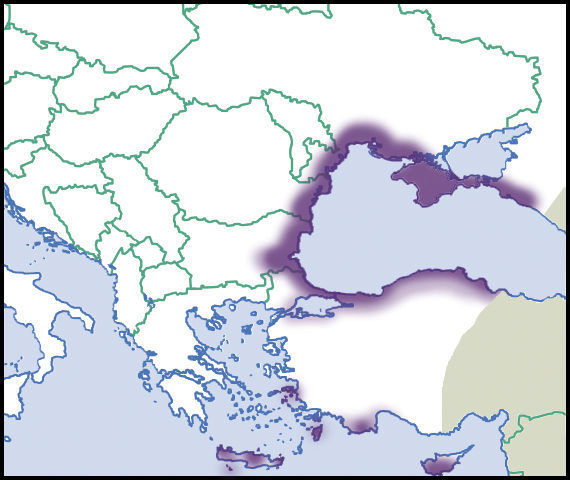
Distribution

The species is found in Western Asia. and around the Black Sea.

== Taxonomy ==
This is a rare case in which the author of a species dedicated the species name to himself.
