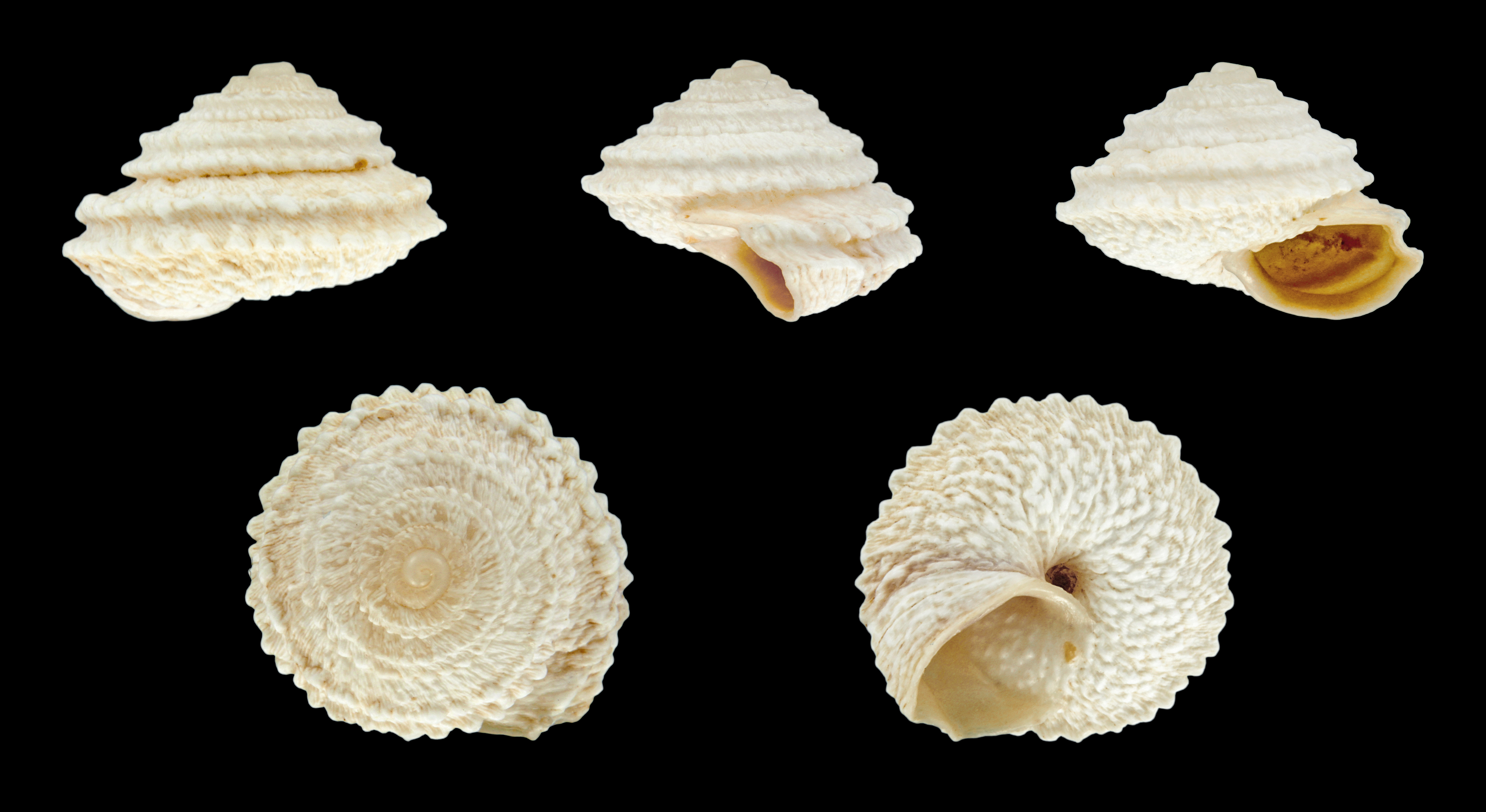

Conservation status
- Vulnerable (IUCN 3.1)

Scientific classification
- Kingdom: Animalia
- Phylum: Mollusca
- Class: Gastropoda
- Order: Stylommatophora
- Family: Geomitridae
- Genus: Obelus
- Species: O. despreauxii

Binomial name
- Obelus despreauxii d'Orbigny, 1839

Synonyms
- Helix despreauxii d'Orbigny, 1839 (original combination); Obelus (Obelus) despreauxii (d'Orbigny, 1839) · alternate representation

= Obelus despreauxii =

Species of gastropod

Obelus despreauxii is a European species of small air-breathing land snail, a terrestrial pulmonate gastropod mollusc in the family Geomitridae.

This species is endemic to Canary Islands.
