= Spirorbula latens =

Conservation status
- Least Concern (IUCN 3.1)

Scientific classification
- Kingdom: Animalia
- Phylum: Mollusca
- Class: Gastropoda
- Order: Stylommatophora
- Family: Geomitridae
- Genus: Spirorbula
- Species: S. latens

Binomial name
- Spirorbula latens (R. T. Lowe, 1852)

Synonyms
- Helix latens R. T. Lowe, 1852 (original combination)

Species of gastropod

Spirorbula latens is a species of air-breathing land snail, a terrestrial pulmonate gastropod mollusc in the family Geomitridae, the hairy snails and their allies.

This species is endemic to Madeira, Portugal.
