= Actinella actinophora =

Conservation status
- Vulnerable (IUCN 3.1)

Scientific classification
- Kingdom: Animalia
- Phylum: Mollusca
- Class: Gastropoda
- Order: Stylommatophora
- Family: Geomitridae
- Genus: Actinella
- Species: A. actinophora

Binomial name
- Actinella actinophora (R.T. Lowe, 1831)

Species of gastropod

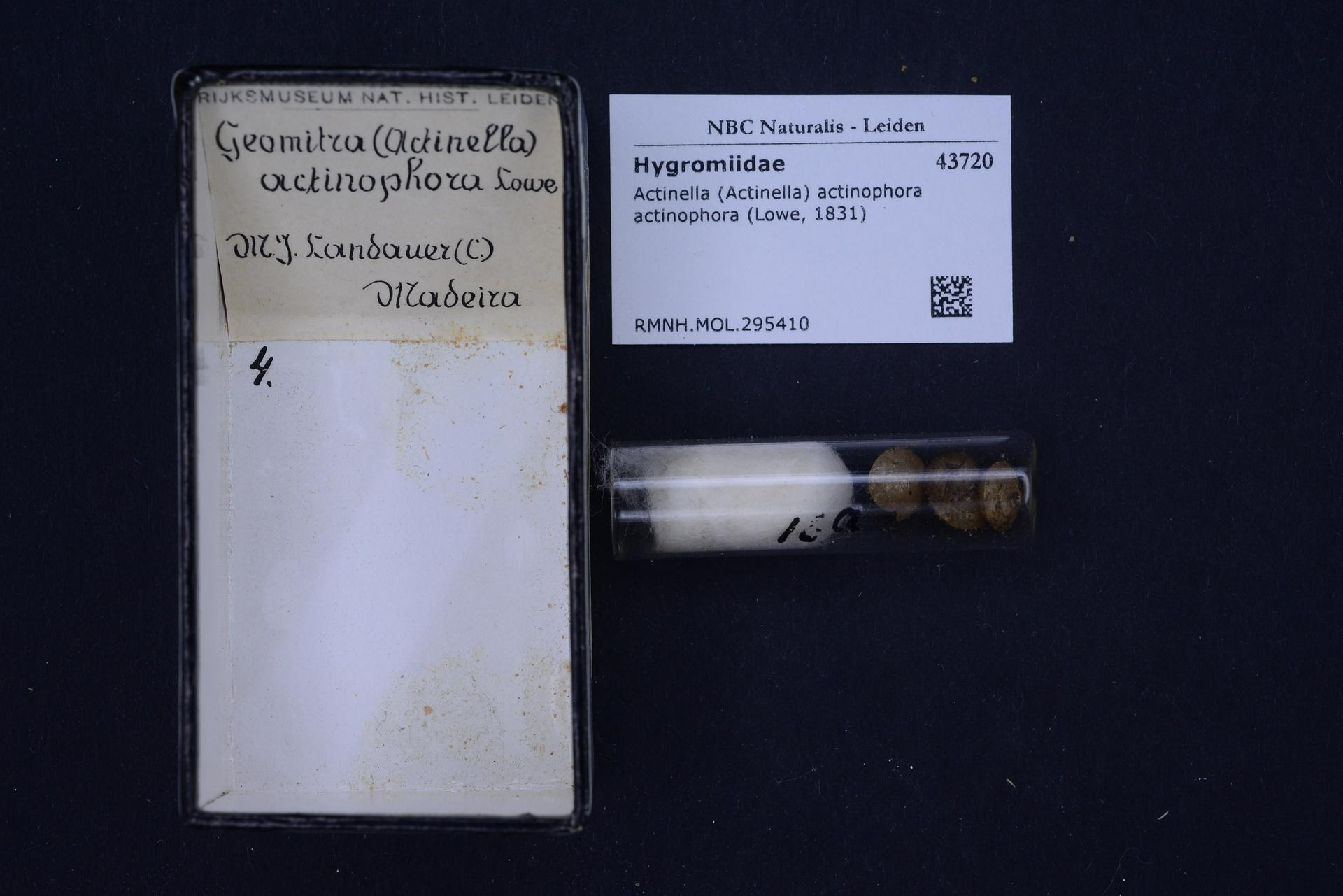
Actinella actinophora (Lowe, 1831)

Actinella actinophora is a species of land snail in the family Geomitridae. It is endemic to Madeira, where it occurs on two islands of the archipelago.

This snail lives in deep, moist leaf litter. It can be found in laurisilva habitat in mountainous areas and on coastal grasslands. Some subpopulations are threatened by habitat degradation, while others are more protected.
