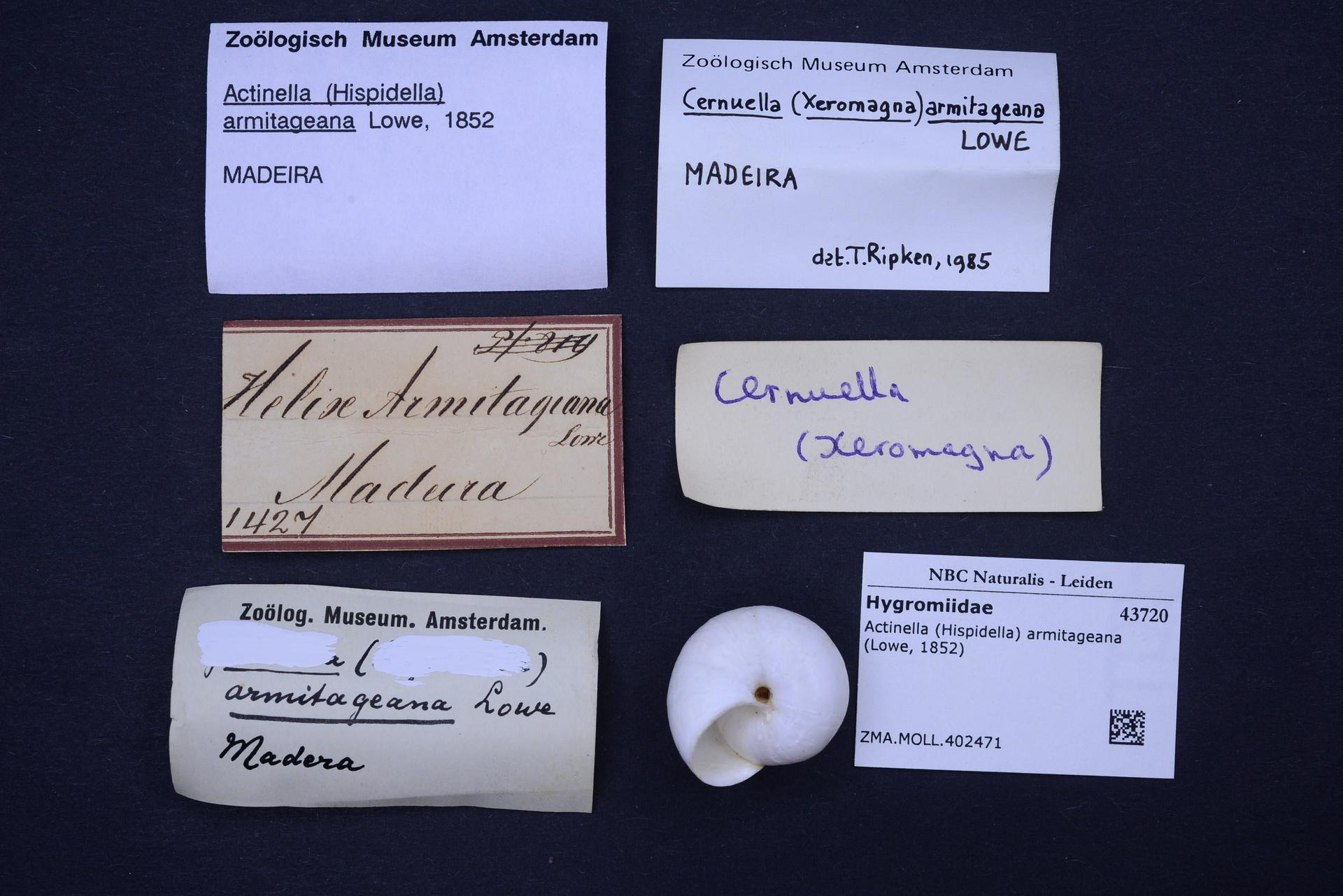
- Preserved shell

Conservation status
- Endangered (IUCN 3.1)

Scientific classification
- Kingdom: Animalia
- Phylum: Mollusca
- Class: Gastropoda
- Order: Stylommatophora
- Family: Geomitridae
- Genus: Actinella
- Species: A. armitageana

Binomial name
- Actinella armitageana (Lowe, 1852)

= Actinella armitageana =

Species of gastropod

Actinella armitageana is a species of air-breathing land snail, a terrestrial pulmonate gastropod mollusk in the family Geomitridae.

This species is endemic to Portugal. Its natural habitat is temperate grassland.
