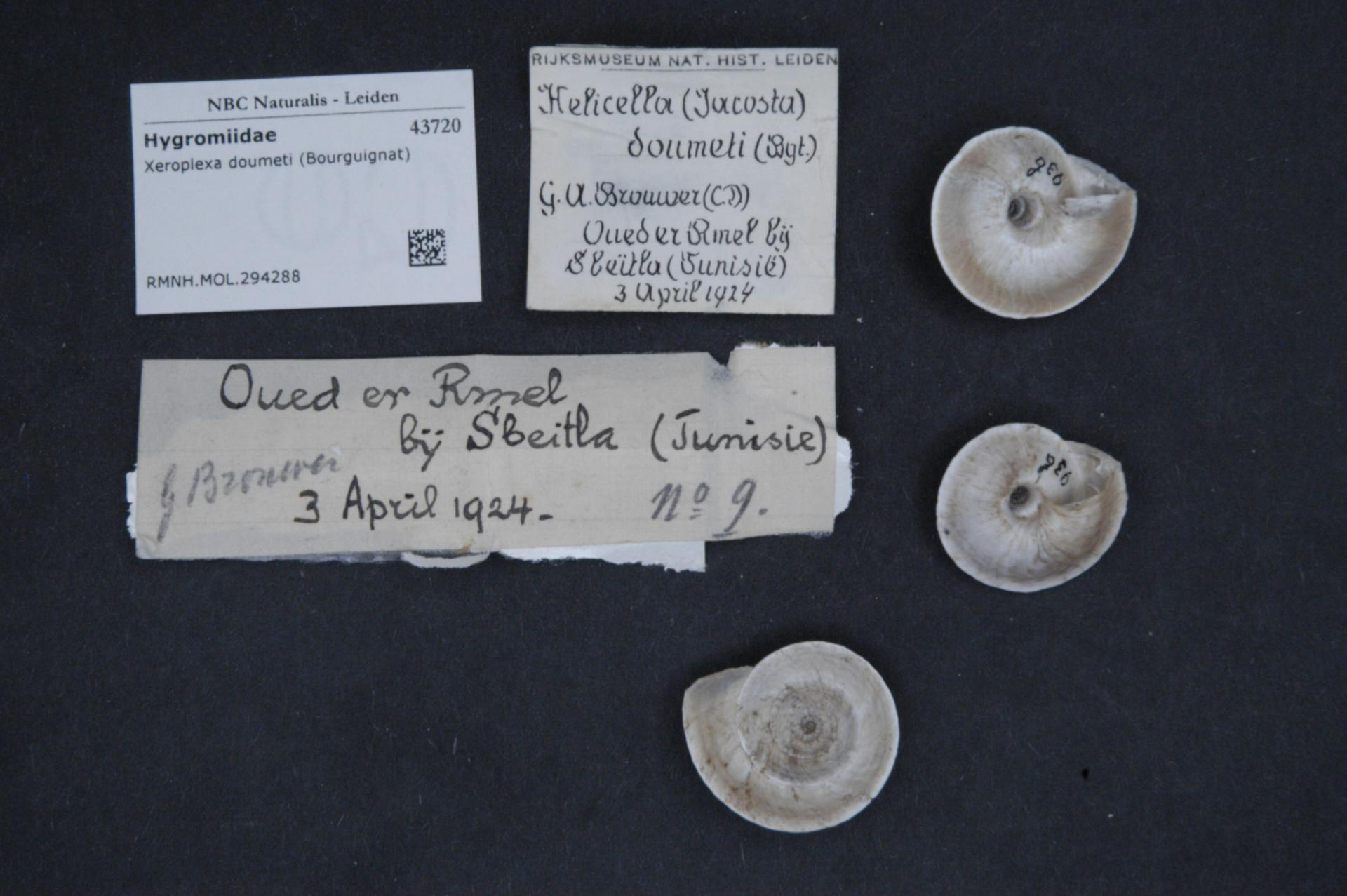
- Shell of Xeroplana doumeti (specimen at Naturalis Biodiversity Center)

Scientific classification
- Kingdom: Animalia
- Phylum: Mollusca
- Class: Gastropoda
- Order: Stylommatophora
- Infraorder: Helicoidei
- Superfamily: Helicoidea
- Family: Geomitridae
- Genus: Xeroplana; Monterosato, 1892

Type species
- Helix doumeti Bourguignat, 1876

Synonyms
- Helix (Numidia) Issel, 1885 (invalid; not Forster, 1817 nor...); Numidia Issel, 1885 (invalid, preoccupied); Xerofalsa Monterosato, 1892; Xerophila (Xeroplana) Monterostao, 1892 (superseded generic combination)

= Xeroplana =

Genus of gastropods

Xeroplana is a genus of small, air-breathing land snails, terrestrial pulmonate gastropod mollusks in the subfamily Helicellinae of the family Geomitridae.

== General characteristics ==
(Original description in Italian) The Tunisian group consists of nummuliform (coin-shaped) species that feature a sharp keel, a faded coloration, and a nearly horny substance. The umbilicus is open and flared.

== Species ==
- Xeroplana doumeti (Bourguignat, 1876)
- Xeroplana enica (Letourneux & Bourguignat, 1887)
- Xeroplana idia (Issel, 1885)
- Xeroplana marocana Ahuir, 2018
- Xeroplana tissotiana (Bourguignat, 1887)
- Xeroplana zeugitana (Letourneux & Bourguignat, 1887)
