= Lemniscia =

Scientific classification
- Kingdom: Animalia
- Phylum: Mollusca
- Class: Gastropoda
- Order: Stylommatophora
- Superfamily: Helicoidea
- Family: Geomitridae
- Subfamily: Geomitrinae
- Genus: Lemniscia; R.T. Lowe, 1855

Type species
- Helix michaudi Deshayes, 1832

Synonyms
- Helix (Lemniscia) R. T. Lowe, 1855

Genus of gastropods

Lemniscia is a genus of air-breathing land snails, terrestrial pulmonate gastropod mollusks in the family Geomitridae, the hairy snails and their allies.

== Species ==
Species within the genus Lemniscia include:

- Lemniscia galeata (R. T. Lowe, 1862)
- Lemniscia michaudi (Deshayes, 1832)

Synonyms

- Lemniscia calva (R. T. Lowe, 1831): synonym of Caseolus (Caseolus) calvus (R. T. Lowe, 1831) represented as Caseolus calvus (R. T. Lowe, 1831)
