= Plentuisa =

Scientific classification
- Kingdom: Animalia
- Phylum: Mollusca
- Class: Gastropoda
- Order: Stylommatophora
- Infraorder: Helicoidei
- Superfamily: Helicoidea
- Family: Geomitridae
- Genus: Plentuisa; Puente & Prieto, 1992

Type species
- Plentuisa vendia Puente & Prieto, 1992

Genus of gastropods

Plentuisa vendia is a species of land snail in the subfamily Helicellinae of the family Geomitridae, the hairy snails and their allies.

== Distribution ==
It is endemic to Spain.

This snail is known only from the Picos de Europa range in northern Spain. It has been found at only three locations. There it lives in open, rocky habitat, taking shelter in crevices and under plants. Its entire range is within Picos de Europa National Park, where it receives some protection.
