= Pseudoxerophila =

Scientific classification
- Kingdom: Animalia
- Phylum: Mollusca
- Class: Gastropoda
- Order: Stylommatophora
- Family: Geomitridae
- Subfamily: Helicellinae
- Tribe: Helicopsini
- Genus: Pseudoxerophila; Westerlund, 1879

Genus of molluscs

Pseudoxerophila is a genus of gastropods belonging to the family Geomitridae.

The species of this genus are found in Mediterranean.

Species:

- Pseudoxerophila bathytera (Westerlund & Blanc, 1879)
- Pseudoxerophila confusa Gittenberger, 1991
- Pseudoxerophila oertzeni (Maltzan, 1887)
