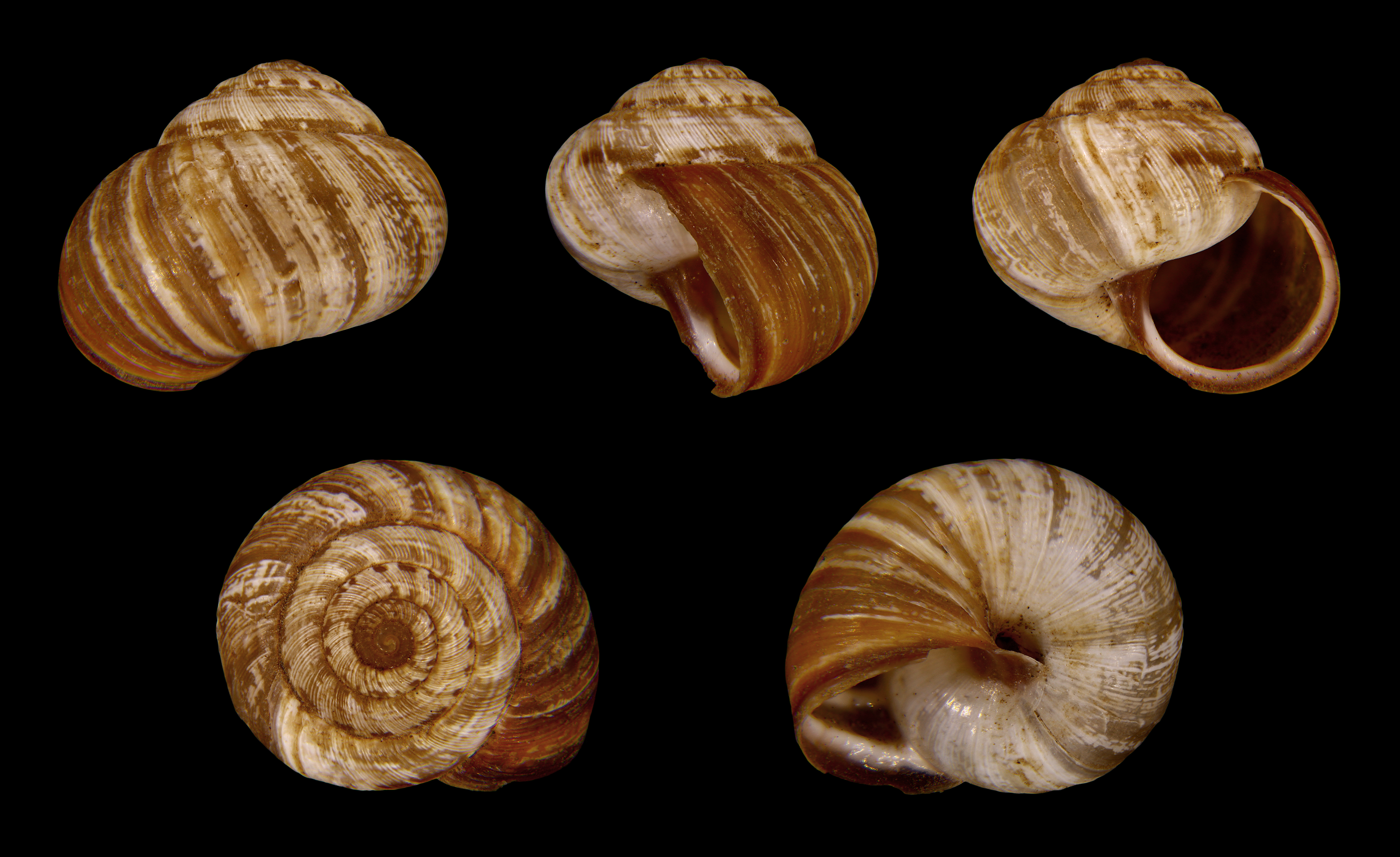
- Five views of a shell of Xeromunda candiota (Pfeiffer, 1849)

Scientific classification
- Kingdom: Animalia
- Phylum: Mollusca
- Class: Gastropoda
- Order: Stylommatophora
- Family: Geomitridae
- Subfamily: Helicellinae
- Genus: Xeromunda; Monterosato, 1892

Type species
- Helix candiota L. Pfeiffer, 1849

Synonyms
- Xeromunda (Candidella) Hausdorf, 1990; Xerophila (Xeromunda) Monterosato, 1892

= Xeromunda =

Genus of gastropods

Xeromunda is a genus of small air-breathing land snails, terrestrial pulmonate gastropod mollusks in the subfamily Helicellinae of the family Geomitridae, the harry snails and their allies.

Species of snails in this genus make and use love darts as part of their mating behavior.

== Species ==
Species within the genus Xeromunda include:

- Xeromunda alticola Hausdorf, 1995
- Xeromunda candiota (L. Pfeiffer, 1849)
- Xeromunda durieui (L. Pfeiffer, 1848)
- Xeromunda mairei (Pallary, 1929) (synonym: Xerophila mairei Pallary, 1929)
- Xeromunda peloponnesia Hausdorf, 1990
- Xeromunda thessalica Hausdorf, 1990
- Xeromunda vulgarissima (Mousson, 1859)
