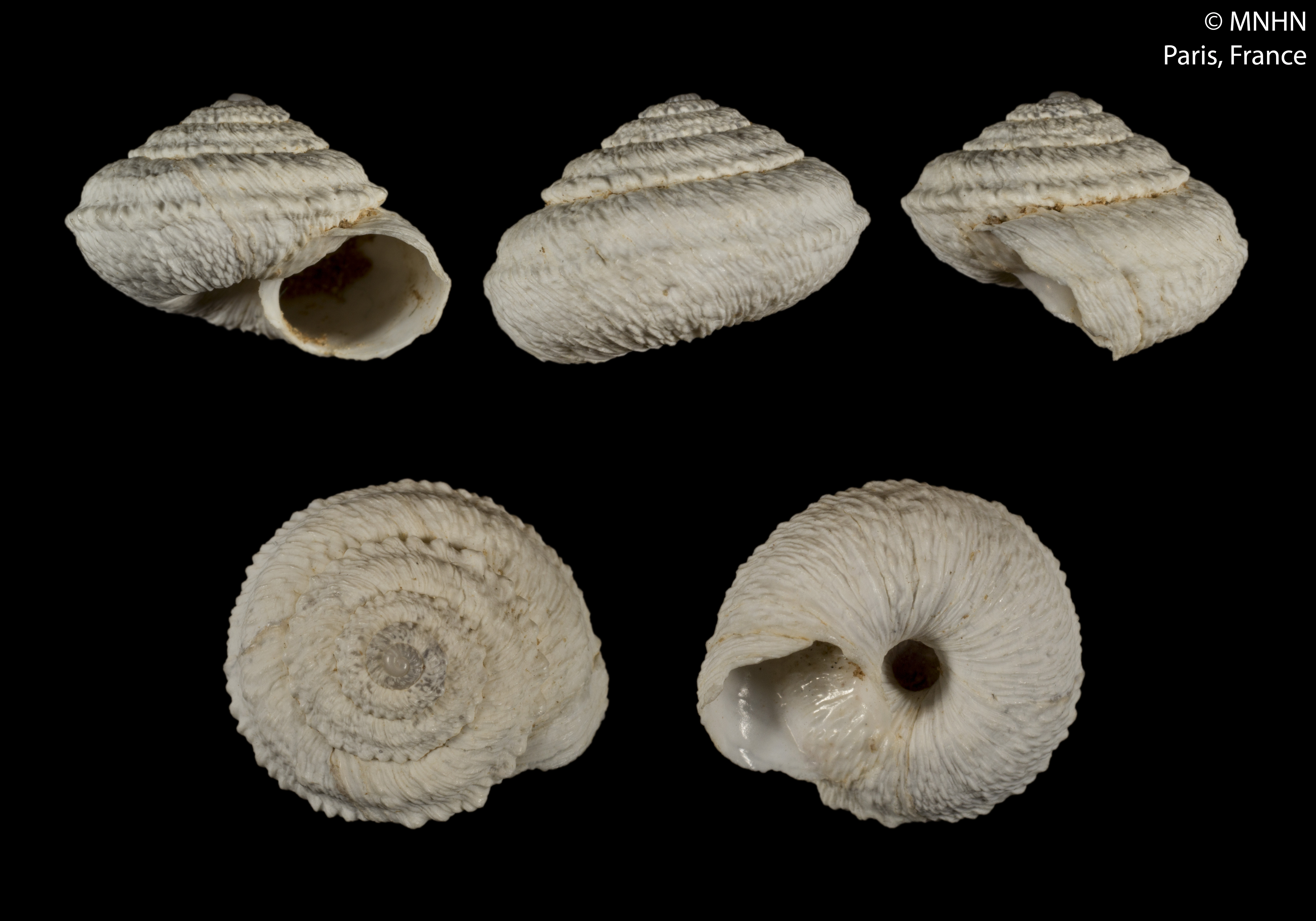
- Shell of Xeroleuca mograbina (syntype at MNHN, Paris)

Scientific classification
- Kingdom: Animalia
- Phylum: Mollusca
- Class: Gastropoda
- Order: Stylommatophora
- Superfamily: Helicoidea
- Family: Geomitridae
- Subfamily: Helicellinae
- Genus: Xeroleuca; Kobelt, 1877

Type species
- Helix turcica Holten, 1802

Synonyms
- Helix (Xeroleuca) Kobelt, 1877; Xerophila (Xeroleuca) Kobelt, 1877 (superseded generic combination)

= Xeroleuca =

Genus of gastropods

Xeroleuca is a genus of air-breathing land snails, a pulmonate gastropod in the subfamily Helicellinae of the family Geomitridae, the typical snails.

It contains the following species:

- Xeroleuca degenerans (Mousson, 1873)
- Xeroleuca mogadorensis (Bourguignat, 1863)
- Xeroleuca mograbina (Morelet, 1852)
- Xeroleuca privatiana (Pallary, 1918)
- Xeroleuca renati (Dautzenberg, 1894)
- Xeroleuca turcica (Holten, 1802)

Taxa inquirenda

- Xeroleuca babelis Pallary, 1920 (taxon inquirendum)
- Xeroleuca brulardi Pallary, 1913 (taxon inquirendum)
- Xeroleuca chabertiana Pallary, 1923 (taxon inquirendum)
- Xeroleuca rebiana Pallary, 1913
