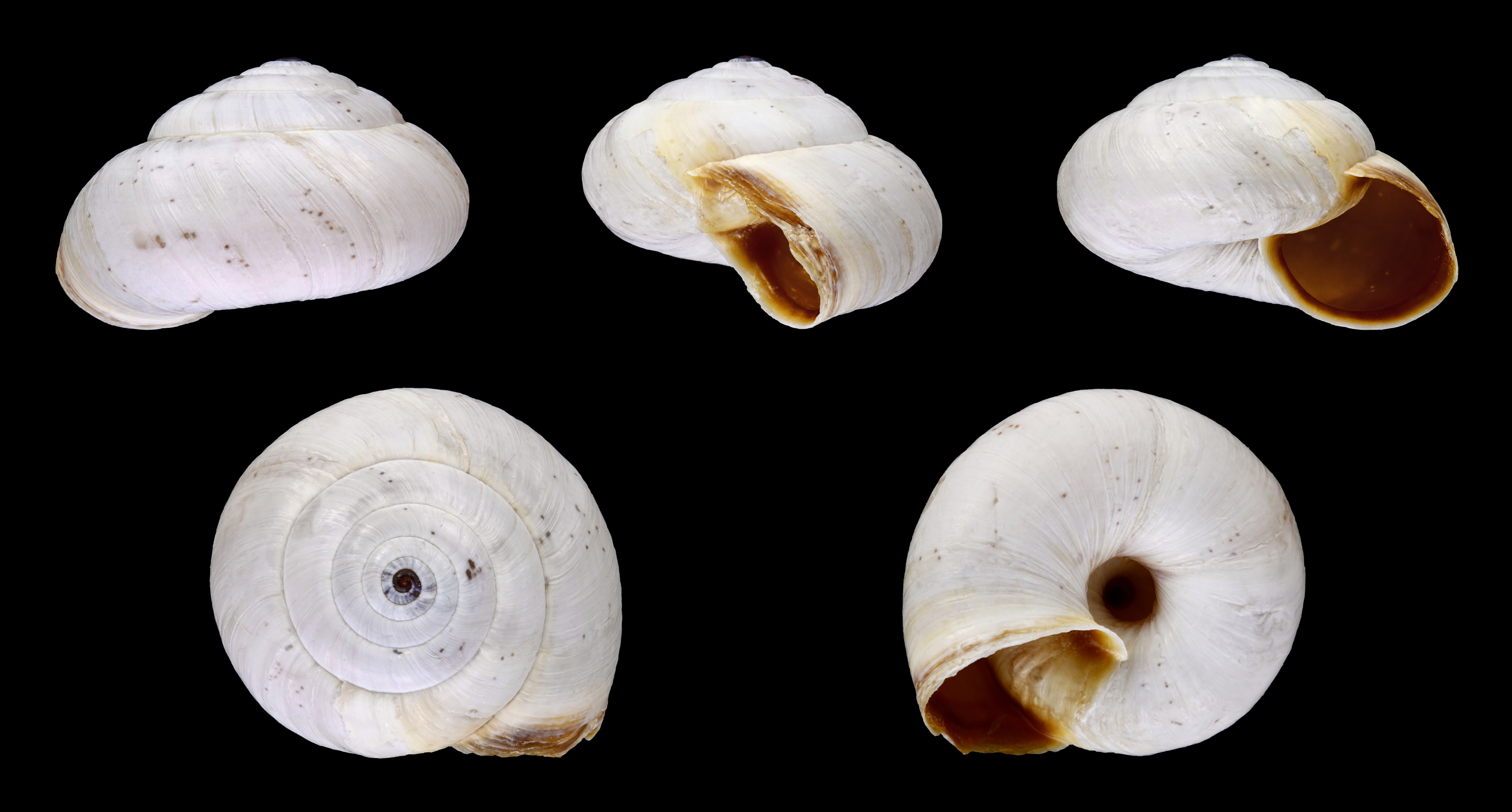
- Xeropicta derbentina (Krynicki, 1836)

Scientific classification
- Kingdom: Animalia
- Phylum: Mollusca
- Class: Gastropoda
- Order: Stylommatophora
- Infraorder: Helicoidei
- Superfamily: Helicoidea
- Family: Geomitridae
- Genus: Xeropicta; Monterosato, 1892

Type species
- Helix krynickii Krynicki, 1833

Synonyms
- Helicella (Xeropicta) Monterosato, 1892; Xerophila (Xeropicta) Monterosato, 1892

= Xeropicta =

Genus of gastropods

Xeropicta is a genus of small air-breathing land snails, pulmonate gastropod mollusks in the subfamily Helicellinae of the family Geomitridae, the hairy snails and their allies.

== Distribution ==
The distribution of the genus Xeropicta includes south-eastern Europe to Near East and north-eastern Africa.

Species in this genus have not yet become established in the US, but they are considered to represent potentially serious threats as pests, invasive species which could negatively affect agriculture, natural ecosystems, human health or commerce. Therefore, it has been suggested that these species be given top national quarantine significance in the USA.

== Description ==
The shell is always white with brown spiral bands. The shell is medium-sized to small with a subdepressed to subconoidal spire. The umbilicus is open.

=== Reproductive system ===
There is a presence of two symmetrical dart sacs and two long accessory sacs, which are always longer than the dart sacs. There are four branched mucous glands around the vagina and penis is with penial appendix at its base. Penis is innervated from the right cerebral ganglion.

== Species ==
Species within the genus Xeropicta include:

- Xeropicta akrotirica Gittenberger, 1991
- Xeropicta candaharica (L. Pfeiffer, 1846)
- Xeropicta carmelensis Forcart, 1976
- Xeropicta derbentina (Krynicki, 1836)
- Xeropicta ilanae Forcart, 1981
- Xeropicta krynickii (Krynicki, 1833) - type species
- Xeropicta ledereri (Pfeiffer, 1856)
- Xeropicta mesopotamica (Mousson, 1874)
- Xeropicta parableta (O. Boettger, 1881)
- Xeropicta smyrnocretica (Germain, 1933)
- Xeropicta vestalis (Pfeiffer, 1841)
- Xeropicta zeevbari Mienis & Rittner, 2020

Synonym

- Xeropicta tiflisiana Lindholm, 1913: synonym of Kalitinaia tiflisiana (Lindholm, 1913)
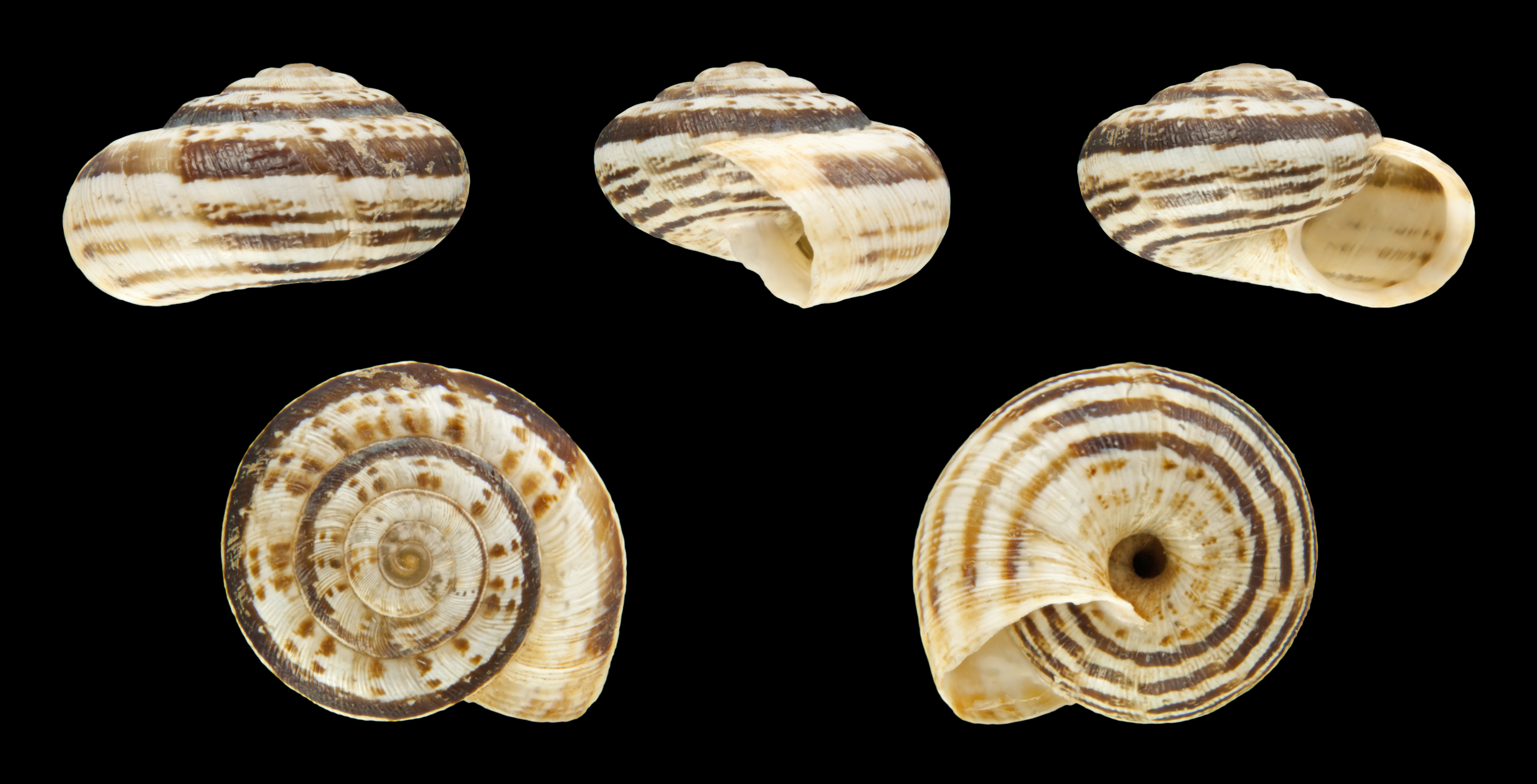
Xeropicta vestalis joppensis
