= Disculella =

Scientific classification
- Kingdom: Animalia
- Phylum: Mollusca
- Class: Gastropoda
- Order: Stylommatophora
- Superfamily: Helicoidea
- Family: Geomitridae
- Subfamily: Geomitrinae
- Genus: Disculella; Pilsbry, 1895

Synonyms
- Geomitra (Disculella) Pilsbry, 1895 (original rank); Helix (Placentula) R. T. Lowe, 1852 (invalid: junior homonym of Placentula Lamarck, 1822; Disculella is a replacement name.)

Genus of gastropods

Disculella is a genus of air-breathing land snails, terrestrial pulmonate gastropod mollusks in the family Geomitridae, the hairy snails and their allies.

== Species ==
Species within the genus Disculella include:

- Disculella compar (R. T. Lowe, 1831)
- Disculella madeirensis (W. Wood, 1828)
- Disculella spirulina (T. D. A. Cockerell, 1921)
