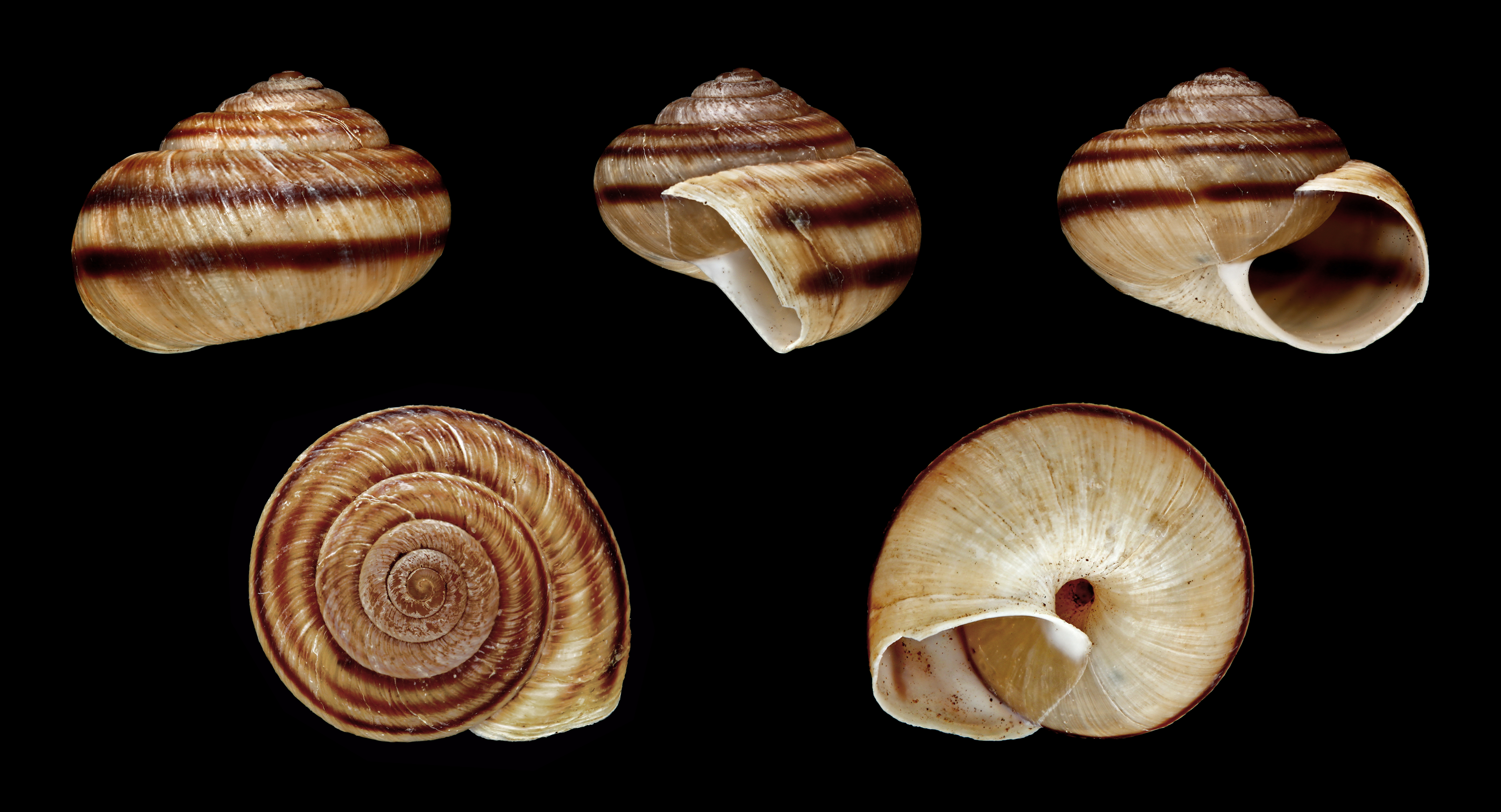

Conservation status
- Vulnerable (IUCN 3.1)

Scientific classification
- Kingdom: Animalia
- Phylum: Mollusca
- Class: Gastropoda
- Order: Stylommatophora
- Family: Geomitridae
- Genus: Plebecula
- Species: P. giramica

Binomial name
- Plebecula giramica Lowe, 1852

Synonyms
- Actinella (Plebecula) giramica (R. T. Lowe, 1852) superseded combination; Actinella giramica (R. T. Lowe, 1852) superseded combination; Helix (Plebecula) giramica R. T. Lowe, 1852 (basionym)

= Plebecula giramica =

Species of gastropod

Plebecula giramica is a species of air-breathing land snail, a terrestrial pulmonate gastropod mollusk in the family Geomitridae.

This species is endemic to Madeira, Portugal. Its natural habitats are temperate forests and temperate grassland. It is threatened by habitat loss.
