= Domunculifex =

Scientific classification
- Domain: Eukaryota
- Kingdom: Animalia
- Phylum: Mollusca
- Class: Gastropoda
- Order: Stylommatophora
- Family: Geomitridae
- Subfamily: Geomitrinae
- Tribe: Geomitrini
- Genus: Domunculifex; Brozzo, De Mattia, Harl & Neiber, 2020

Genus of gastropods

Domunculifex is a genus of land snails in the family Geomitridae.

== Species ==
- Domunculifex littorinella (Mabille, 1883)
