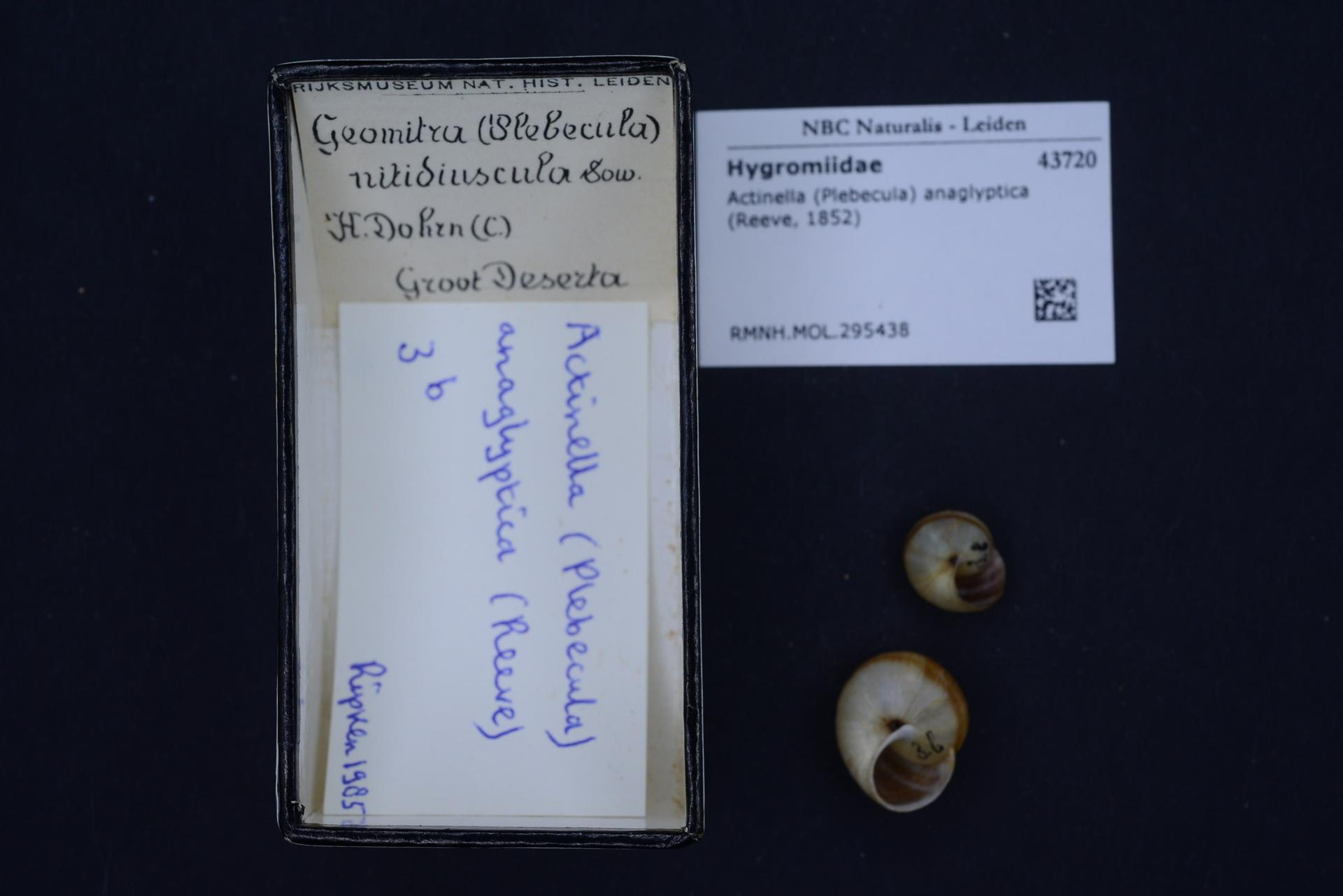
- Preserved shell

Conservation status
- Near Threatened (IUCN 3.1)

Scientific classification
- Kingdom: Animalia
- Phylum: Mollusca
- Class: Gastropoda
- Order: Stylommatophora
- Family: Geomitridae
- Subfamily: Geomitrinae
- Tribe: Geomitrini
- Genus: Plebecula
- Species: P. anaglyptica

Binomial name
- Plebecula anaglyptica (Reeve, 1852)

Synonyms
- Actinella (Plebecula) anaglyptica (Reeve, 1852) · alternate representation; Actinella anaglyptica (Reeve, 1852) (superseded generic combination); Helix anaglyptica Reeve, 1852 (original combination)

= Plebecula anaglyptica =

Species of gastropod

Plebecula anaglyptica is a species of land snail in the family Geomitridae.

It is endemic to Madeira, where it is known only from the Ilhas Desertas.

This snail lives in grass tussocks among the rock litter. It has been threatened by habitat degradation caused by a population of goats living on the island. Most of the goats have been removed as part of efforts to preserve the habitat for this snail and other local species, so it is not considered to be as vulnerable at this time.
