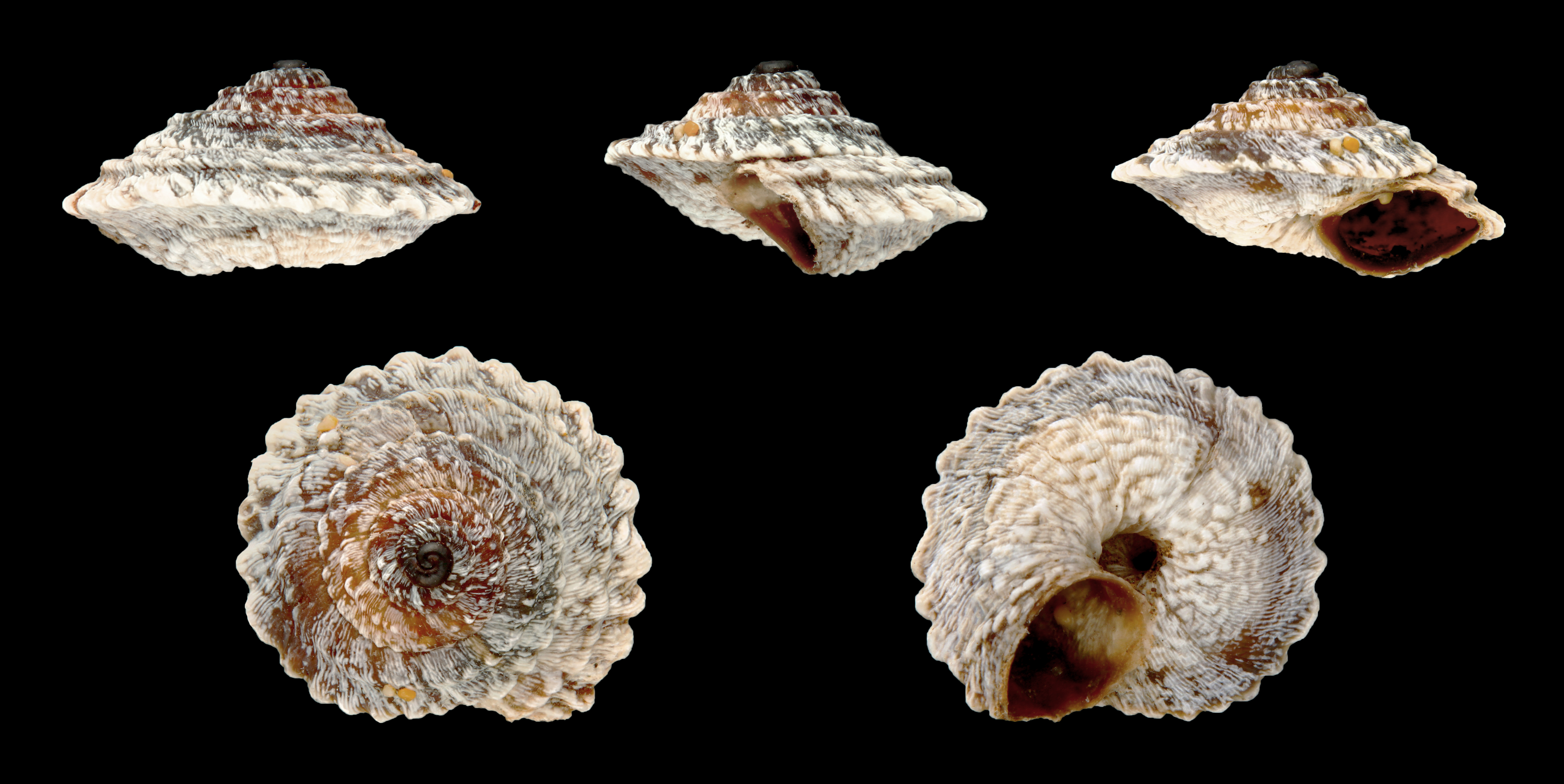
- Obelus moderatus (Mousson 1857)

Scientific classification
- Kingdom: Animalia
- Phylum: Mollusca
- Class: Gastropoda
- Order: Stylommatophora
- Family: Geomitridae
- Subfamily: Geomitrinae
- Genus: Obelus; Hartmann, 1842

Type species
- Helix despreauxii d'Orbigny, 1839

Synonyms
- Anomalina Mousson, 1843; Obelus (Grohiellus) Neiber, Walther, Santana, M. R. Alonso & Ibáñez, 2016 · alternate representation; Obelus (Obelus) W. Hartmann, 1842 · alternate representation

= Obelus (gastropod) =

Genus of gastropods

Obelus is a European genus of small air-breathing land snails, terrestrial pulmonate gastropod molluscs in the subfamily Geomitrinae of the family Geomitridae, the hairy snails and their allies.

== Species ==
Species within the genus Obelus include:

- Obelus despreauxii (d'Orbigny, 1839)
- Obelus discogranulatus M. R. Alonso & Groh, 2003
- Obelus mirandae (R. T. Lowe, 1861)
- Obelus moderatus (Mousson, 1857)
- Obelus moratus (Mousson, 1872)
- Obelus pumilio (Dillwyn, 1817)
- Obelus zarzaensis Neiber, Walther, Santana, M. R. Alonso & Ibáñez, 2016

Synonym

- Obelus philamnius (Bourguignat, 1863): synonyym of Xerocrassa philamnia (Bourguignat, 1863) (superseded combination)
