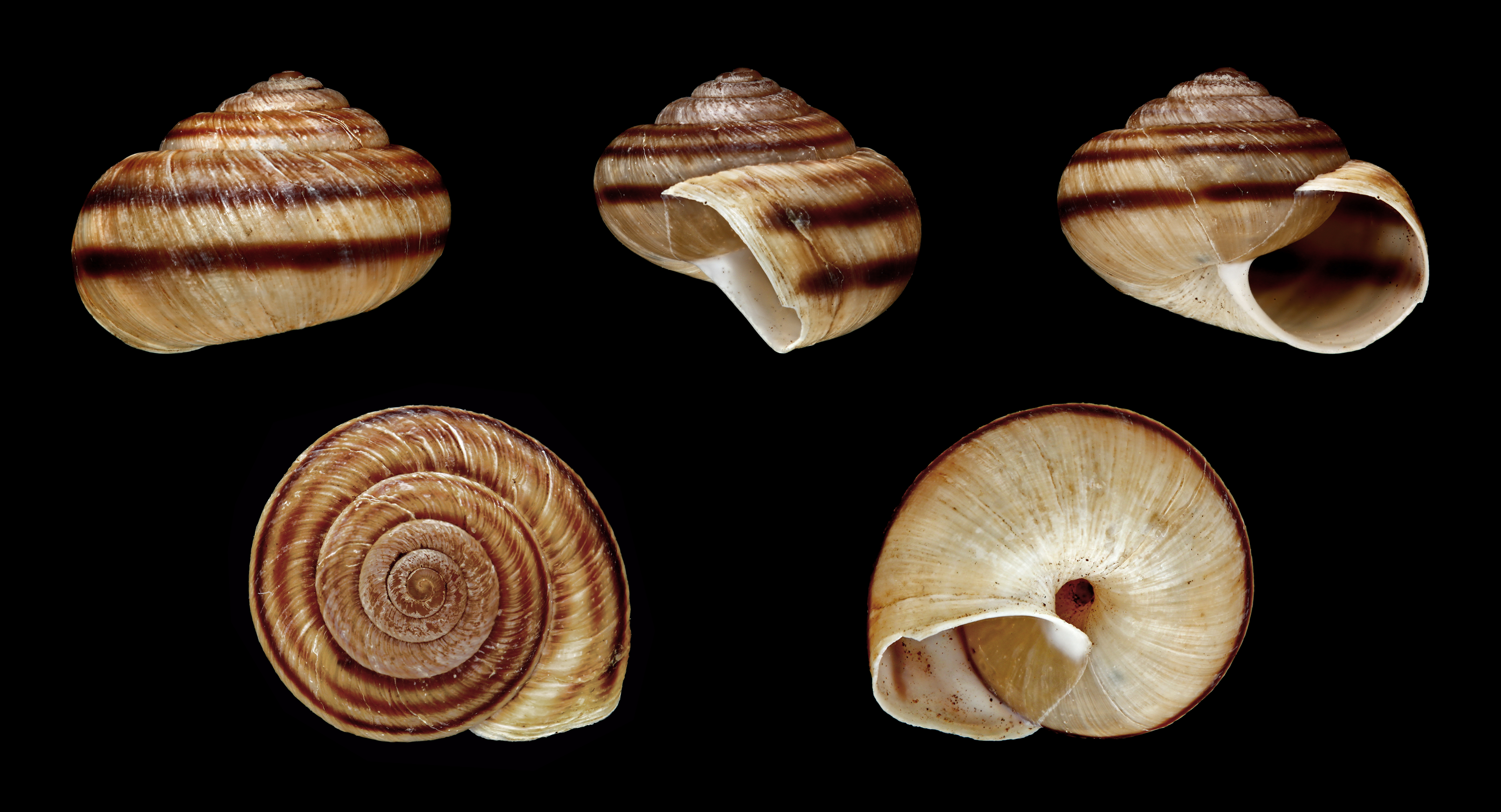
- Shell of Plebecula giramica

Scientific classification
- Kingdom: Animalia
- Phylum: Mollusca
- Class: Gastropoda
- Order: Stylommatophora
- Family: Geomitridae
- Subfamily: Geomitrinae
- Tribe: Geomitrini
- Genus: Plebecula; R. T. Lowe, 1852

Type species
- Helix (Plebecula) vulgata R. T. Lowe, 1852

Synonyms
- Actinella (Plebecula) R. T. Lowe, 1852 superseded combination; Helix (Plebecula) R. T. Lowe, 1852 (basionym)

= Plebecula =

Genus of gastropods

Plebecula is a genus of land snails in the subfamily Geomitrinae of the family Geomitridae.

== Species ==
- Plebecula anaglyptica (Reeve, 1852)
- Plebecula giramica (R. T. Lowe, 1852)
- Plebecula nitidiuscula (G. B. Sowerby I, 1824)
- † Plebecula saxipotens (Wollaston, 1878)

Synonyms

- † Plebecula comatula (F. Sandberger, 1871): synonym of † Pseudoleptaxis comatula (F. Sandberger, 1871)
- † Plebecula declivis (F. Sandberger, 1870): synonym of † Dentellocaracolus declivis (F. Sandberger, 1870)
- † Plebecula divisionensis [sic]: synonym of† Plebecula divionensis (J. Martin, 1866) (incorrect subsequent spelling)
- † Plebecula fraasi Jooss, 1912: synonym of † Wenzia fraasi (Jooss, 1912) (new combination)
- † Plebecula ramondi (Brongniart, 1810): synonym of † Wenzia ramondi (Brongniart, 1810)

Taxon inquirendum

- † Plebecula divionensis (J. Martin, 1866)
