= Domunculifex littorinella =

Conservation status
- Vulnerable (IUCN 3.1)

Scientific classification
- Kingdom: Animalia
- Phylum: Mollusca
- Class: Gastropoda
- Order: Stylommatophora
- Family: Geomitridae
- Genus: Domunculifex
- Species: D. littorinella

Binomial name
- Domunculifex littorinella Mabille, 1883

Synonyms
- Actinella effugiens (Waldén, 1983); Actinella (Plebecula) littorinella (J. Mabille, 1883) (superseded generic combination); Actinella littorinella (J. Mabille, 1883) (superseded generic combination); Helix (Helicella) lurida R. T. Lowe, 1831 (invalid: junior homonym of Helix...); Helix littorinella J. Mabille, 1883 (original name)

Species of gastropod

Domunculifex littorinella is a species of air-breathing land snails, terrestrial pulmonate gastropod mollusks in the family Geomitridae.

It is endemic to Madeira, Portugal. It is threatened by habitat loss.
