= Ponentina =

Scientific classification
- Kingdom: Animalia
- Phylum: Mollusca
- Class: Gastropoda
- Order: Stylommatophora
- Family: Geomitridae
- Subfamily: Geomitrinae
- Tribe: Ponentinini
- Genus: Ponentina; Hesse, 1921

Synonyms
- Fruticicola (Ponentina) P. Hesse, 1921 (original rank); Henkia E. Gittenberger, 2012 (junior synonym)

Genus of gastropods

Ponentina is a genus of small air-breathing land snails, terrestrial pulmonate gastropod mollusks in the family Geomitridae, the hairy snails and their allies.

== Species ==
Species within this genus include:

- Ponentina antoni (E. Gittenberger, 2012)
- Ponentina curtivaginata D. T. Holyoak & G. A. Holyoak, 2012
- Ponentina excentrica G. A. Holyoak & D. T. Holyoak, 2012
- Ponentina foiaensis G. A. Holyoak & D. T. Holyoak, 2012
- Ponentina grandiducta G. A. Holyoak & D. T. Holyoak, 2012
- Ponentina martigena (Férussac, 1832)
- Ponentina monoglandulosa D. T. Holyoak & G. A. Holyoak, 2012
- Ponentina octoglandulosa D. T. Holyoak & G. A. Holyoak, 2012
- Ponentina papillosa G. A. Holyoak & D. T. Holyoak, 2012
- Ponentina platylasia (da Silva e Castro, 1887)
- Ponentina ponentina (Morelet, 1845)
- Ponentina revelata (Michaud, 1831)
- Ponentina rosai (da Silva e Castro, 1887)
- Ponentina subvirescens (Bellamy, 1839), the type species

Taxon inquirendum

- Ponentina ponsonbyana (Pilsbry, 1895)
