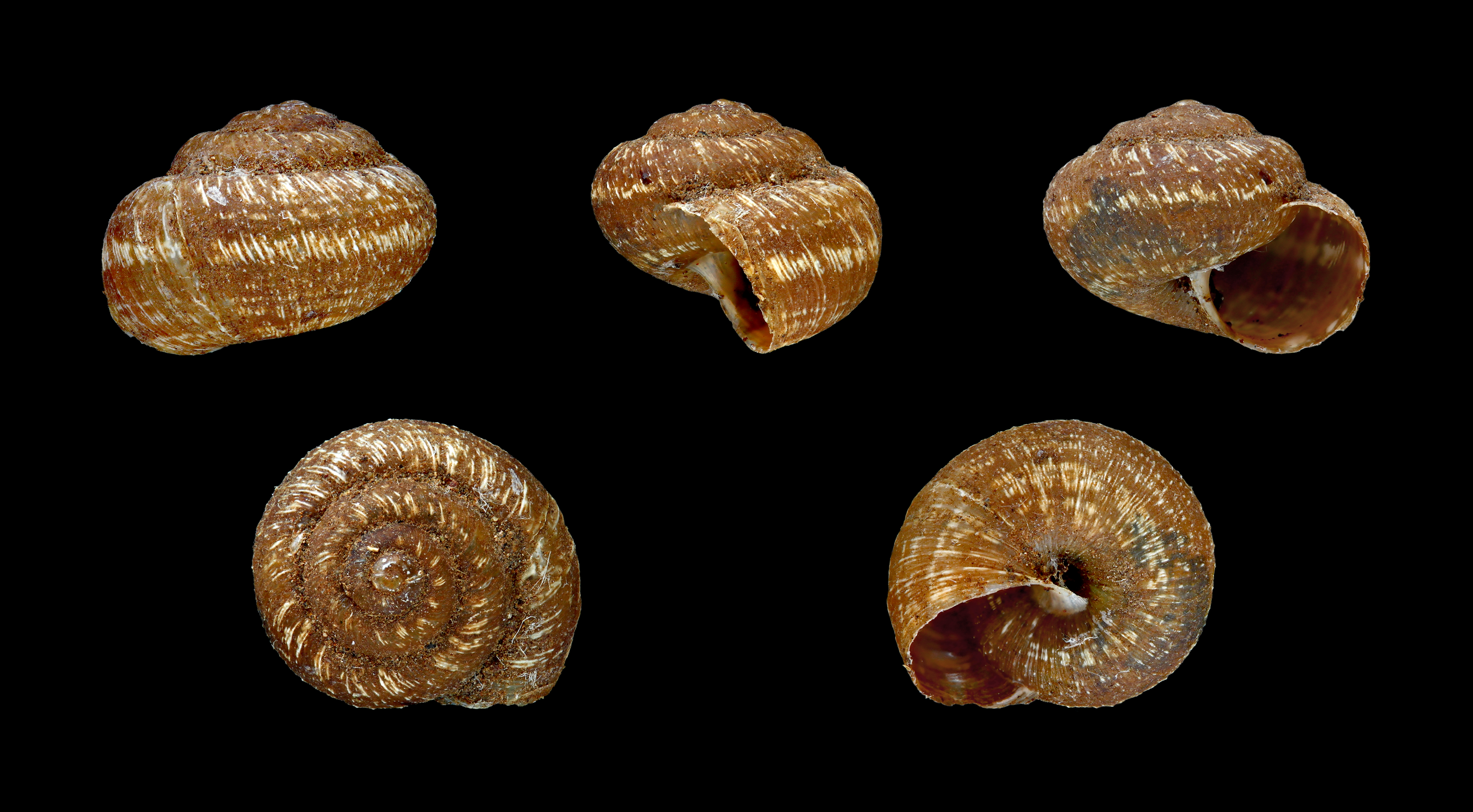
- Microxeromagna

Scientific classification
- Kingdom: Animalia
- Phylum: Mollusca
- Class: Gastropoda
- Order: Stylommatophora
- Infraorder: Helicoidei
- Superfamily: Helicoidea
- Family: Geomitridae
- Genus: Microxeromagna; Ortiz de Zarate Lopez, 1950

Synonyms
- Cernuella (Microxeromagna) Ortiz de Zárate López, 1950 ·

= Microxeromagna =

Genus of molluscs

Microxeromagna is a genus of small, air-breathing land snails, terrestrial pulmonate gastropod mollusks in the subfamily Helicellinae of the family Geomitridae.

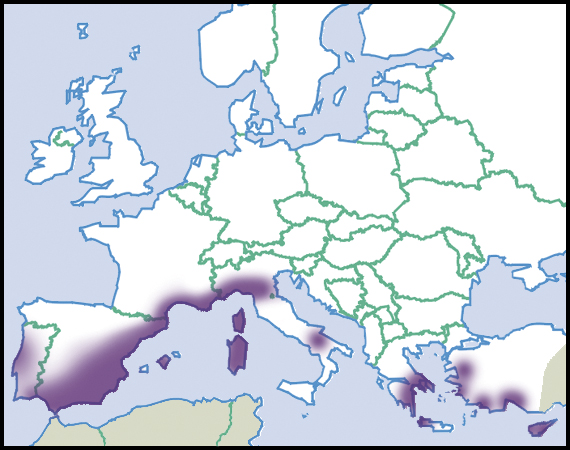
Distribution

The genus is distributed along the Mediterranean basin, from the Italian Peninsula to Middle east.

== Species ==
The genus Microxeromagna is monospecific:

- Microxeromagna lowei (Potiez & Michaud, 1838)

Synonyms

- Microxeromagna armillata (R. T. Lowe, 1852): synonym of Microxeromagna lowei (Potiez & Michaud, 1838) (junior synonym)
