= Spirorbula =

Scientific classification
- Kingdom: Animalia
- Phylum: Mollusca
- Class: Gastropoda
- Order: Stylommatophora
- Superfamily: Helicoidea
- Family: Geomitridae
- Subfamily: Geomitrinae
- Genus: Spirorbula; Lowe, 1852

Type species
- Helix latens C. T. Lowe, 1852

Synonyms
- Helix (Irus) R. T. Lowe, 1852(junior synonym); Helix (Spirorbula) C. T. Lowe, 1852 · unaccepted (original rank); Irus R. T. Lowe, 1852 ·

Genus of gastropods

Spirorbula is a genus of air-breathing land snails, terrestrial pulmonate gastropod mollusks in the subfamily Geomitrinae of the family Geomitridae, the hairy snails and their allies.

== Distribution ==
The distribution of the genus Spirorbula includes the area from Madeira to Porto Santo in the country of Portugal.

== Species ==
Species within the genus Spirobula include:

- Spirorbula depauperata (R. T. Lowe, 1831)
- Spirorbula latens (R. T. Lowe, 1852)
- † Spirorbula latina (Paiva, 1866)
- Spirorbula obtecta (R. T. Lowe, 1852) - type species
- Spirorbula squalida (R.T. Lowe, 1852)
