= Keraea =

Scientific classification
- Kingdom: Animalia
- Phylum: Mollusca
- Class: Gastropoda
- Order: Stylommatophora
- Family: Geomitridae
- Genus: Keraea; Gude, 1911

Genus of gastropods

Keraea is a genus of air-breathing land snails, terrestrial pulmonate gastropod molluscs in the family Geomitridae.

== Species ==
Species within the genus Keraea include:

- Keraea bertholdiana (L. Pfeiffer, 1852)
- Keraea deflorata (R. T. Lowe, 1855) (uncertain)
- † Keraea garachicoensis (Wollaston, 1878) extinct
- Keraea gorgonarum (Dohrn, 1869)
