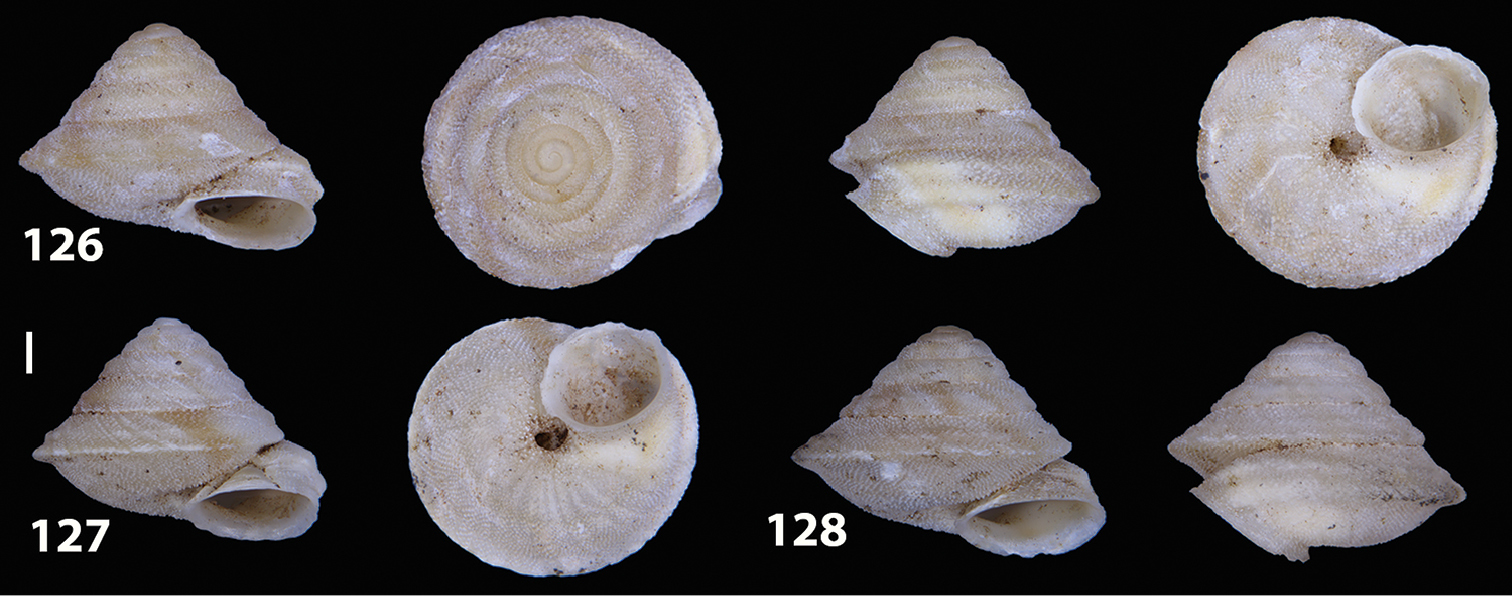
- Shell of Wollastonaria falknerorum

Scientific classification
- Kingdom: Animalia
- Phylum: Mollusca
- Class: Gastropoda
- Order: Stylommatophora
- Infraorder: Helicoidei
- Superfamily: Helicoidea
- Family: Geomitridae
- Genus: Wollastonaria; De Mattia, Neiber & Groh, 2018

Type species
- Helix turricula R. T. Lowe, 1831

Synonyms
- Wollastonia De Mattia, Neiber & Groh, 2018 (invalid; non Heer, 1852 etc., Wollastonaria is a replacement name)

= Wollastonaria =

Genus of gastropods

Wollastonaria is a genus of gastropod molluscs in the subfamily Geomitrinae of the family Geomitridae.

== Species ==
- † Wollastonaria beckmanni (De Mattia & Groh, 2018)
- † Wollastonaria falknerorum (Groh, Neiber & De Mattia, 2018)
- † Wollastonaria inexpectata (De Mattia & Groh, 2018)
- Wollastonaria jessicae (De Mattia, Neiber & Groh, 2018)
- Wollastonaria klausgrohi (De Mattia & Neiber, 2018)
- Wollastonaria leacockiana (Wollaston, 1878)
- Wollastonaria oxytropis (R. T. Lowe, 1831)
- †Wollastonaria ripkeni (De Mattia & Groh, 2018)
- † Wollastonaria subcarinatula (Wollaston, 1878)
- Wollastonaria turricula (R. T. Lowe, 1831)
- Wollastonaria vermetiformis (R. T. Lowe, 1855)

== See also ==
- List of gastropods described in 2018
