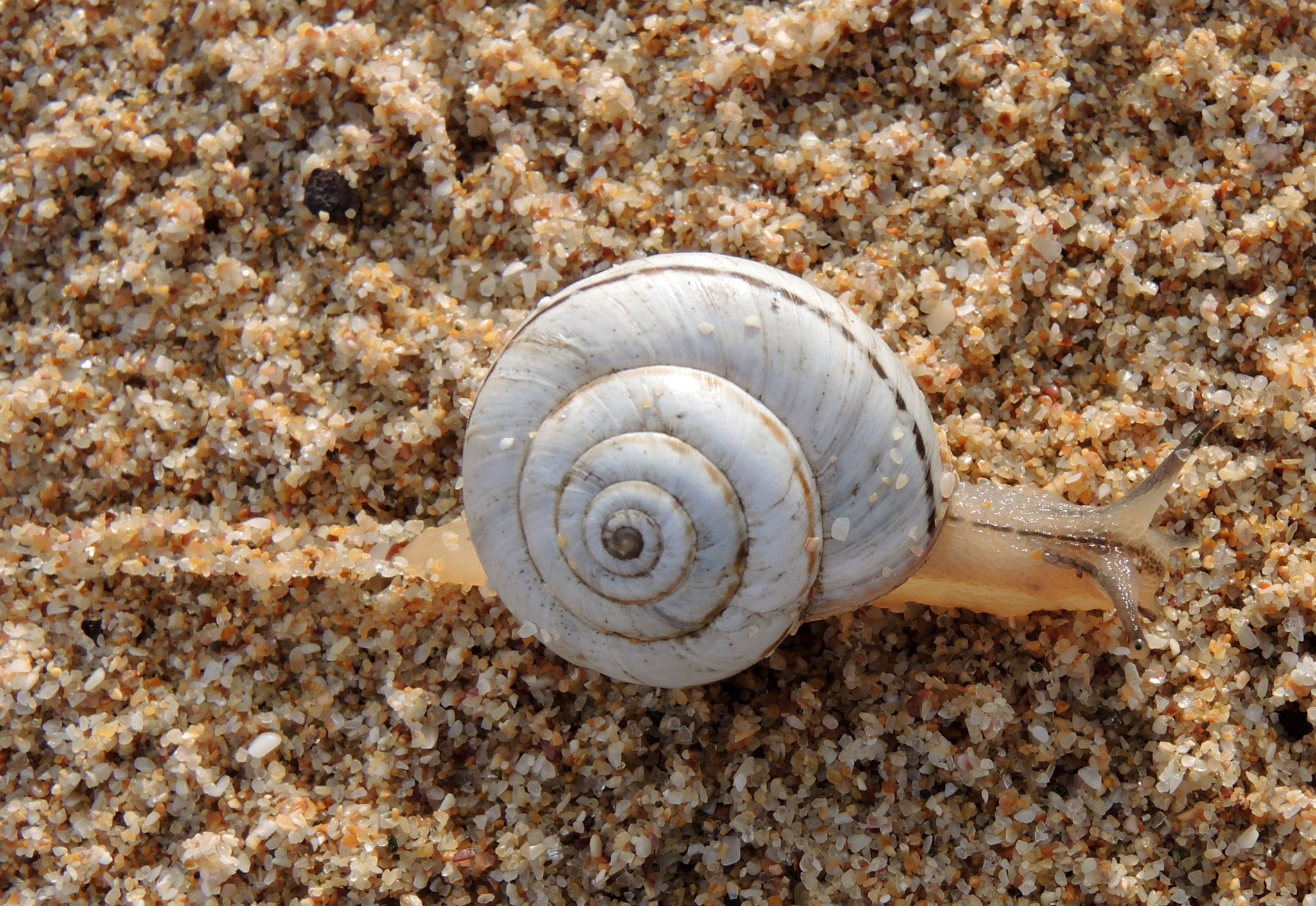
- Cernuella virgata

Scientific classification
- Kingdom: Animalia
- Phylum: Mollusca
- Class: Gastropoda
- Order: Stylommatophora
- Superfamily: Helicoidea
- Family: Geomitridae; Boettger, 1909

Type genus
- Geomitra Swainson, 1840

Genera
- See text

= Geomitridae =

Family of gastropods

Geomitridae is a taxonomic family of small to medium-sized air-breathing land snails, terrestrial pulmonate gastropod mollusks in the superfamily Helicoidea.

== Anatomy ==
The family is characterized by the presence of a free right ommatophoral retractor (passing outside the peni-oviducal angle) and a double stimulatory apparatus. A free right ommatophoral retractor has been linked to adaptation to xeric habitats.

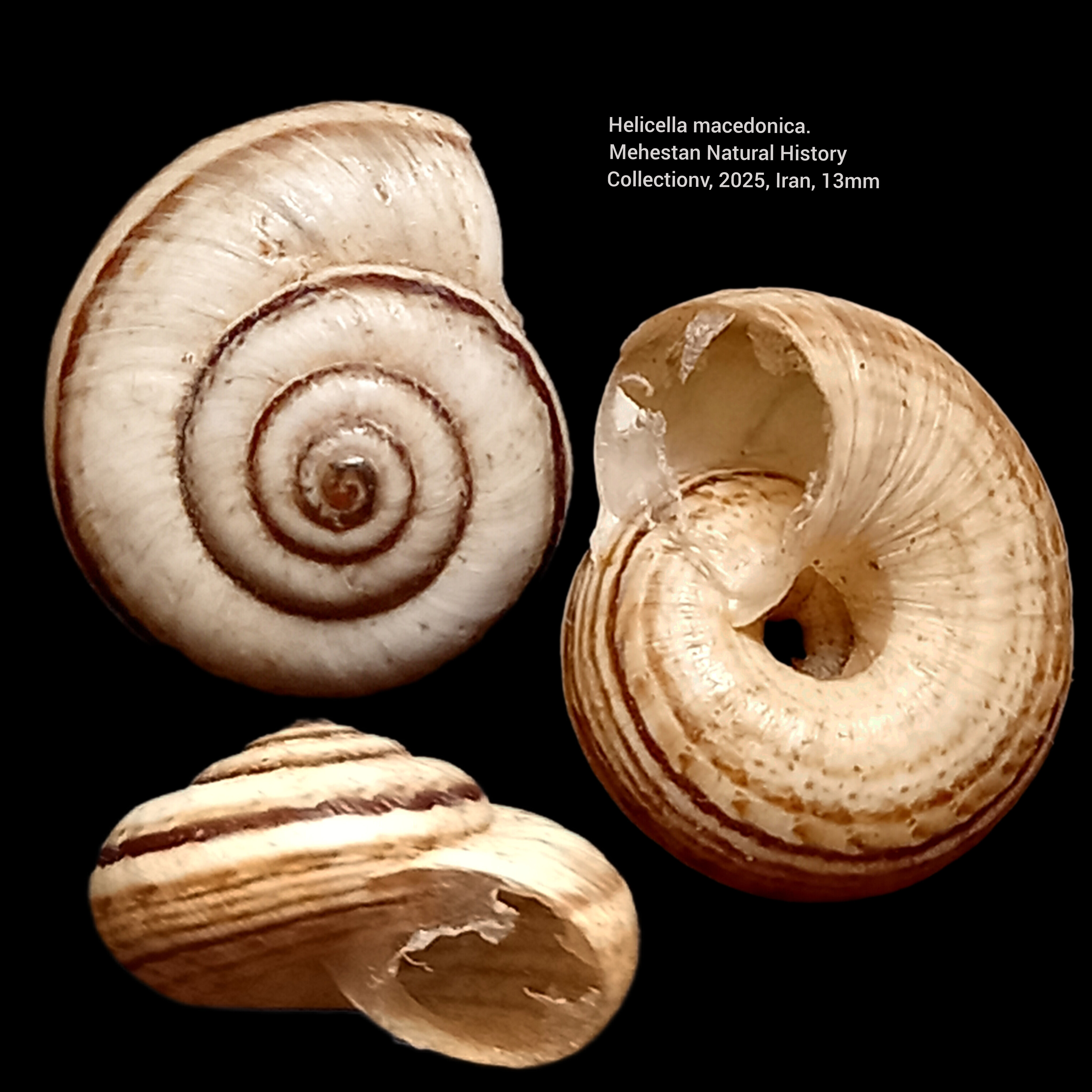
Helicella macedonica

== Taxonomy ==
The family Geomitridae is subdivided in the following subfamilies (according to Razkin et al., 2015). Genera with the family Geomitridae include:

Family Geomitridae

- Not belonging to a subfamily:
  - Keraea Gude, 1911
  - Peridotitea Torres Alba, Holyoak, D. T., Holyoak, G. A., Vázquez Toro & Ripoll, 2018
- Subfamily Geomitrinae
  - tribe Cochlicellini Schileyko, 1972
    - Cochlicella Férussac, 1821
    - Monilearia Mousson, 1872
    - Obelus W. Hartmann, 1842
    - Ripkeniella Hutterer & E. Gittenberger, 1998
  - tribe Geomitrini C. Boettger, 1909 - synonym: Ochthephilinae Zilch, 1960 (n.a.)
    - Actinella R. T. Lowe, 1852
    - Callina R. T. Lowe, 1855
    - Caseolus R. T. Lowe, 1852
    - Discula R. T. Lowe, 1852
    - Disculella Pilsbry, 1895
    - Domunculifex Brozzo, De Mattia, Harl & Neiber, 2020
    - Geomitra Swainson, 1840
    - Helicomela R. T. Lowe, 1855
    - Heterostoma W. Hartmann, 1843: synonym of Steenbergia Mandahl-Barth, 1950 (invalid: junior homonym of Heterostoma de Filippi, 1837 [Platyhelminthes])
    - Hystricella R. T. Lowe, 1855
    - Lemniscia R. T. Lowe, 1855
    - Moreletina de Frias Martins, 2002
    - Plebecula R. T. Lowe, 1852
    - Pseudocampylaea L. Pfeiffer, 1877
    - Serratorotula Groh & Hemmen, 1986
    - Spirorbula R. T. Lowe, 1852
    - Steenbergia Mandahl-Barth, 1950
    - Testudodiscula Brozzo, De Mattia, Harl & Neiber, 2020
    - Wollastonaria De Mattia, Neiber & Groh, 2018
  - tribe Ponentinini Razkin et al., 2015
    - Ponentina P. Hesse, 1921
- subfamily Helicellinae
  - tribe Cernuellini Schileyko, 1991
    - Alteniella Clerx & Gittenberger, 1977
    - Cernuella Schlüter, 1838
    - Microxeromagna Ortiz de Zárate López, 1950
    - Xeroplana Monterosato, 1892
    - Xerosecta Monterosato, 1892
  - tribe Helicellini Ihering, 1909 - synonym: Jacostidae Pilsbry, 1948 (inv.)
    - Backeljaia Chueca et al., 2018
    - Candidula Kobelt, 1871
    - Helicella Férussac, 1821
    - Orexana Chueca et al., 2018
    - Xerogyra Monterosato, 1892
    - Xeroleuca Kobelt, 1877
    - Xeroplexa Monterosato, 1892
    - Xerotricha Monterosato, 1892
    - Zarateana Chueca et al., 2018
  - tribe Helicopsini H. Nordsieck, 1987
    - Helicopsis Fitzinger, 1833
    - Pseudoxerophila Westerlund, 1879
    - Xerolenta Monterosato, 1892
    - Xeromunda Monterosato, 1892
    - Xeropicta Monterosato, 1892
  - tribe Plentuisini Razkin et al., 2015
    - Plentuisa Puente & Prieto, 1992
  - tribe Trochoideini H. Nordsieck, 1987
    - Trochoidea T. Brown, 1827
    - Xerocrassa Monterosato, 1892
