= Wiki Loves Earth =

Photographic competition

- Official logo of Wiki Loves Earth
- Genre: Photography
- Begins: May 1
- Ends: July 31
- Frequency: Annually
- Location: Worldwide
- Years active: 2013–present
- Inaugurated: 2013
- Most recent: 2025
- Participants: Photographers
- Organiser: Wikipedia community members
- Website: http://wikilovesearth.org

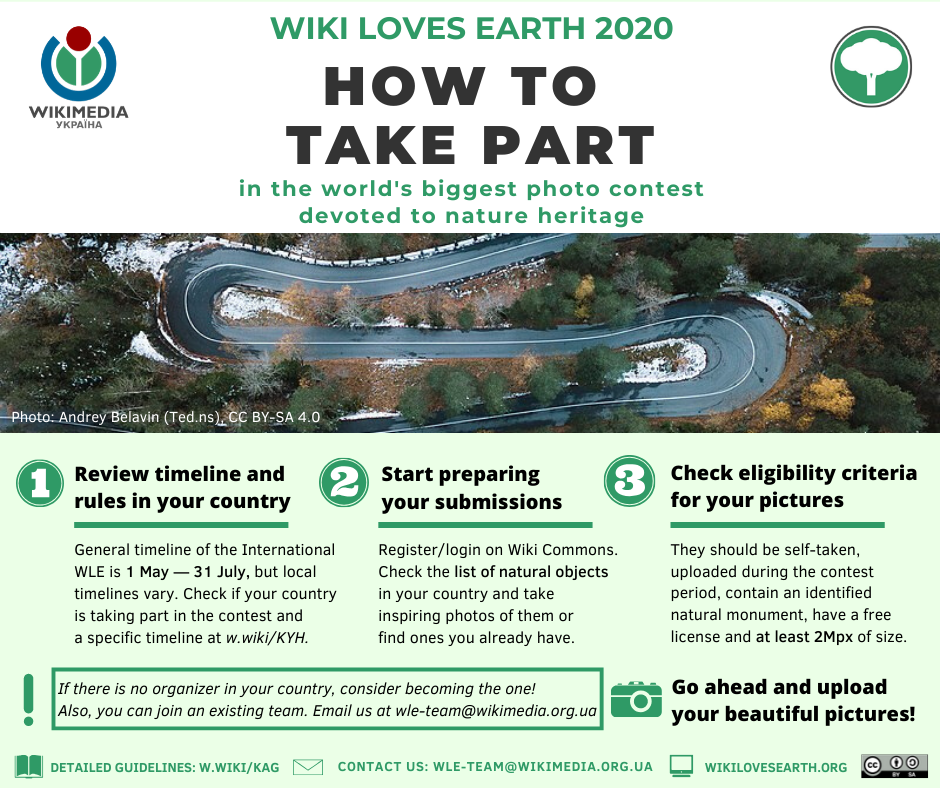
Infographic on how to take part in Wiki Loves Earth

Wiki Loves Earth (WLE) is an annual international photographic competition held throughout May and June, organised worldwide by the Wikipedia community members with the help of local Wikimedia affiliates across the globe. Participants take pictures of local natural heritage and scenic landscape in their countries and upload them to Wikimedia Commons.

The aim of the event is to highlight the conservation areas of the participating countries with the goal to encourage people to capture pictures of these sights and to put them under a free license which can then be re-used not only on Wikipedia but everywhere by everyone.

The first Wiki Loves Earth competition was held in 2013 in Ukraine, and the contest became international in 2014. In 2019, 37 countries participated in the contest.

In 2020, the international contest was extended into July in response to the global COVID-19 pandemic. As of late June, 35 countries have declared their participation in the 2021 contest edition, with more than 63,000 photos uploaded to date.

== History ==
The first Wiki Loves Earth competition was held in 2013 in Ukraine. Head of its organizing committee was ethnographer [[Yevhen Buket]]. In the next years the competition become international and spread to other countries. In 2014, the competition was extended beyond Europe, with a total of 16 participating countries. The 2015 edition of Wiki Loves Earth has seen more than 8,500 contestants participating from 26 countries, with over 100,000 photo submissions. A photo from Pakistan won grand prize in 2015 edition of Wiki Loves Earth, depicting Shangrila Resort, located at Skardu, Gilgit-Baltistan, Pakistan.

Wiki Loves Earth 2016 saw more than 7,000 participants from 26 countries, with over 75,000 photographs submitted. In 2017, the contest expanded its geography more than ever before, with 36 countries participating that year and the contest reaching a record number of over 131,000 uploaded photographs. The number of participating countries slightly decreased in 2018, but the year of 2019 has again seen 37 countries taking part in the competition. Over the past several years, Wiki Loves Earth cooperated with UNESCO, holding special nominations for UNESCO biosphere reserves and UNESCO Global Geoparks.The India edition of Wiki Loves Earth was revived in 2025 after an eight-year hiatus, receiving a strong response with 1,372 contributors and over 9,764 images uploaded.

Wiki Loves Earth is a sister competition of Wiki Loves Monuments, which is also an annual international photographic competition held during the month of September, organised worldwide by the Wikipedia community members and focus on local historical monuments and heritage sites. WLM according to the Guinness Book of Records, is the world's largest photography competition.

== Winners ==
The following is a list of international first prize winners of Wiki Loves Earth:

Year	Photographer	Country	Description
2013	Krasnickaja Katya	Ukraine	Dawn in the Ai-Petri Yaila nature reserve (zakaznik).
2014	Balkhovitin	Ukraine	View of Carpathian National Park from Hoverla, Ivano-Frankivsk Oblast.
2015	Zaeem Siddiq	Pakistan	Shangrila resorts, Skardu. This lake is also known as Lower Kachura lake. Central Karakoram National Park, Gilgit–Baltistan.
2016	Cedomir Zarkovic	Serbia	Stopića cave is a limestone cave near Sirogojno, on the slopes of Mount Zlatibor in the Dinaric Alps.
2017	Sergey Pesterev	Russia	Ogoy Island in winter, Lake Baikal, Pribaikalsky National Park.
2018	Ekaterina Vasyagina	Russia	Cape Stolbchaty at the Kunashir Island after sunset. Kurils Nature Reserve, Russia
2019	Sven Damerow	Germany	Banded demoiselle hovering near a dandelion's seedhead at Gülper See lake in Brandenburg, Germany
2020	Touhid biplob	Bangladesh	Chestnut-tailed starling (Sturnia malabarica) in Satchari National Park, Bangladesh
2021	Luis Afonso	Portugal	Abano beach at sunset, in the Sintra-Cascais Natural Park, Portugal
2021	Мария Обидина	Russia	Arianta arbustorum on the Taraxacum flower: macro shot taken in the Ropsha Forest, Leningrad Oblast, Russia
2022	Neide José Paixão	Portugal	Ilhéu de Cima seen from a sand rock formation, Porto Santo, Madeira, Portugal
2022	Mkrc85	Turkey	Common chameleon in Kapıçam National Park, Kahramanmaraş, Turkey

== Statistics ==
Year	Countries	Uploads	Participants
2013	1	9,695	346
2014	14	62,541	2,889
2015	25	104,201	8,837
2016	24	109,936	13,187
2017	36	130,482	15,074
2018	32	89,683	7,645
2019	37	94,699	9,699
2020	34	106,240	9,095
2021	34	62,491	4,337
2022	38	50,584	4,036
2023	50	60,278	3,399
2024	57	79,681	3,862
2025	55	75,855	5,186
