= Qvarnström =

Qvarnström or Quarnström (literally 'mill stream') is a Swedish surname. Notable people with the surname include:

- Ann-Sophie Qvarnström (born 1958), Swedish illustrator and silversmith
- Carl Gustaf Qvarnström (1810–1867), Swedish sculptor and painter
- Lee Quarnstrom (1939/1940–2021), American journalist
- Titti Qvarnström (born 1979), Swedish chef

== See also ==
- Kvarnström
