= Osama Silwadi =

Palestinian photographer (born 1973)

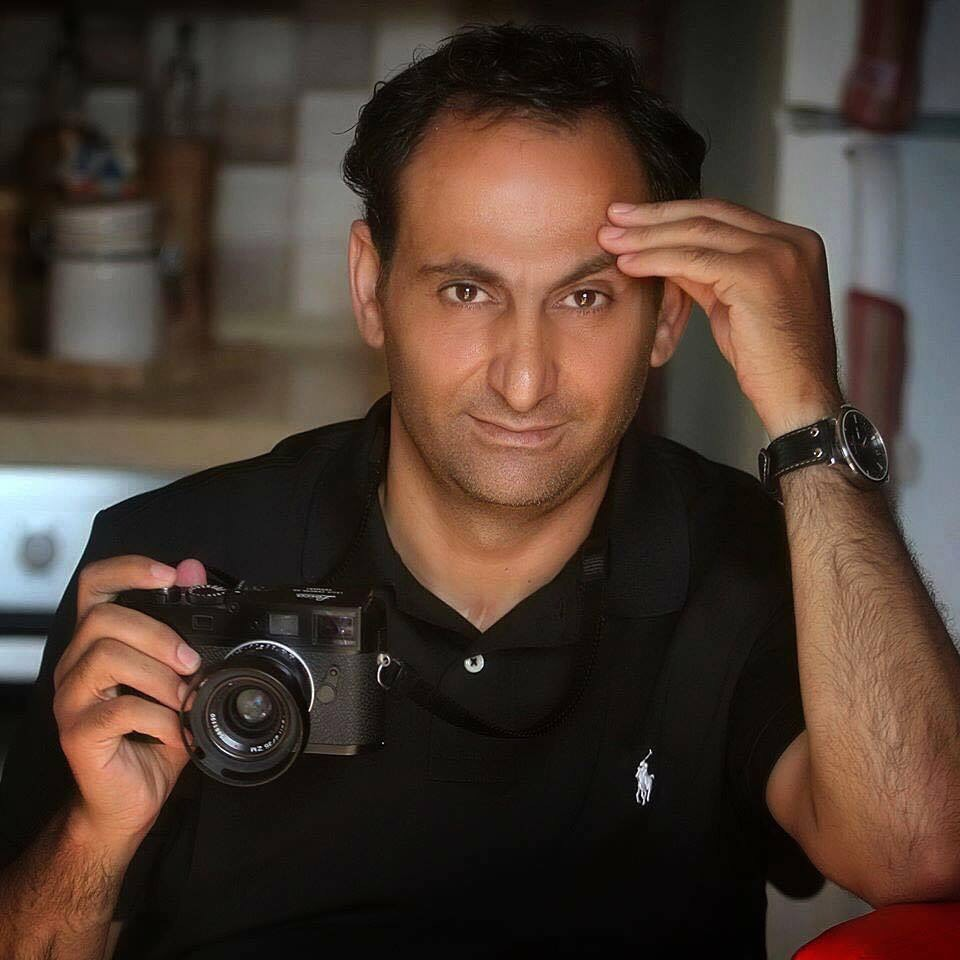
- Born: Osama Silwadi; 14 February 1973 (age 53); Ramallah, State of Palestine
- Occupations: photojournalist, visual storyteller, archivist and folklorist
- Years active: 1991 - Present
- Known for: Palestinian Heritage Documentary

Osama Silwadi (born 14 February 1973 in Ramallah) is a Palestinian photojournalist, visual storyteller, archivist and folklorist. He started his professional career in 1991. During the first Palestinian Intifada, he faced difficulties and challenges and was in danger as he worked in the conflict areas. In October 2006, Osama was seriously injured by a stray bullet during a march in the center of Ramallah, which resulted in paralysis of the lower limbs. Silwadi has won titles inspired by his work in documenting the Palestinian heritage, including "The Eye of Palestine" and the "Palestinian Heritage documentor".

== Work ==
At the age of nineteen, he started working with several local press organizations, then moved to work with the French Press Agency (AFP) for four years. He joined Reuters for more than five years. Silwadi also was a photographer in the Palestinian territories for the French agency Gamma. In 2004, he founded the Apollo Agency, the first Palestinian photography agency. In 2009, he founded and edited the "Wamid" magazine. Silwaid was a consultant for the Yasser Arafat Foundation from 2008 to 2015. Silwadi participated on the jury of photography awards and contests, such as "Youth Eyes on the Silk Road" organized by the United Nations Educational, Scientific and Cultural Organization (UNESCO). In addition, Silwadi was the chief arbiter of the Wiki Loves Monuments conducted by the Wikimedians of the Levant user group in 2017 and 2018.

In addition to Photojournalism, Silwadi has worked on documenting the daily life of the Palestinian people through many stories and record documentary projects, where Osama directed towards a project to constrain the Palestinian heritage in a way takes care of the photographed history of the Palestinian people. Silwadi's photos were published in leading international newspapers and magazines during his tenure, such as National Geographic, Time and Newsweek. Silwadi has held many local and international exhibitions, including in Palestine, Jordan, Egypt, United Arab Emirates, Italy, United States and France.

== Publications ==
Until 2018, Silwadi published the following 11 photo-books:

- "The Palestinian Woman, Tender and Creative" - 1999
- "Here we are" - 2005
- "Palestine ... How Are You" - 2008
- "The Siege" - 2008
- "Al Quds" photos of Jerusalem - 2010
- "Queens of Silk" is a traditional Palestinian fashion - 2012
- "The Revelation of Stones” Palestinian architectural heritage - 2014
- "Mr .Palestine ” 2014 ... Pictures of the late President Yasser Arafat.
- "Wildflowers Of Palestine", visual documentation of wild flowers in Palestine.
- "Canaanite Jewelry ", visual documentation of traditional Palestinian jewelry.
- "Ramallah ...The Picture.. The story”. This book documents the life in the city of Ramallah using pictures; it was published by the Municipality of Ramallah in 2018.

== Coverage ==
Silwadi's work included covering the following events:

- A part of the first Intifada 1989 – 1995
- The establishment of the Palestinian Authority and the entry of Palestinian forces into cities in the West Bank in 1995.
- The first Palestinian elections in 1996.
- Tunnel Intifada 1996
- Intifada of Al-Aqsa (Second Intifada) 2000-2005
- Israeli occupation of the cities of Ramallah and Al-Bireh in 2002.
- The siege of Palestinian President Yasser Arafat in 2004.
- Palestinian President Yasser Arafat's illness and his funeral in 2004.
- Palestinian presidential elections and the assumption of power by President Mahmoud Abbas in 2005.
- Legislative elections in 2006 and the victory of Hamas.
- Visual Documentation Project for the Palestinian Heritage.

== Awards ==
- 2010 - Honored by Aljazeera International Festival of Documentary Films.
- 2012 - Gold Medal of Merit and Excellence from President Mahmoud Abbas.
- 2014 - Honored by the Union of Writers of Palestine and the National Committee for Education, Culture and Science and took title "Eye of Palestine".
- 2017 Honor from our children's festival in Cairo.
