= Kvarnström =

Kvarnström (literally 'mill stream') is a Swedish surname. Notable people with the surname include:

- Johan Kvarnström (born 1986), Finnish politician
- Kurt Kvarnström (born 1948), Swedish politician

== See also ==
- Qvarnström
