= Ann-Sophie =

Ann-Sophie is a feminine given name. Notable people with the name include:

- Ann-Sophie Barwich, assistant professor at Indiana University Bloomington
- Ann-Sophie Bettez (born 1987), Canadian ice hockey forward
- Ann-Sophie Bohm-Eisenbrandt, German politician
- Ann-Sophie Duyck (born 1987), Belgian triathlete
- Ann-Sophie Taschereau (born 2002), Canadian weightlifter
- Ann-Sophie Qvarnström, Swedish illustrator

== See also ==
- Anne-Sophie
