= Hans Tappenbeck =

19th century German military officer

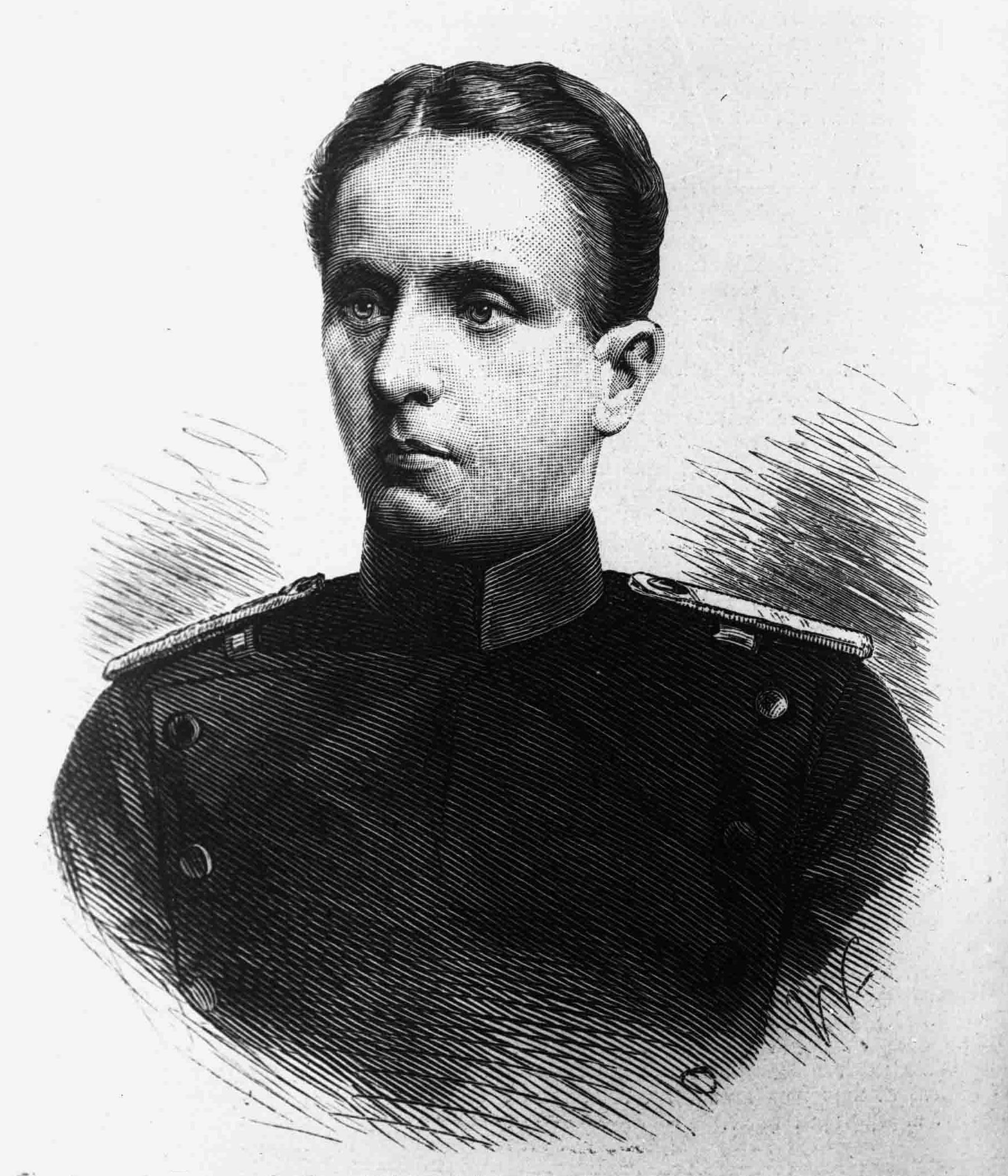
- Hans Tappenbeck, 1888
- Born: 4 January 1861; Wolsier (today part of Havelaue), Western Havelland, Kingdom of Prussia
- Died: 26 July 1889 (aged 28); Douala, Cameroon
- Military career
- Allegiance: German
- Rank: Portepee-Fähnrich
- Unit: 4th Westphalian Infantry Regiment No 17
- Other work: Explorer of Africa

Hans Tappenbeck (born 14 January 1861, Wolsier (today part of Havelaue), Western Havelland, Kingdom of Prussia; died 26 July 1889 in Douala, Cameroon) was a German officer and explorer of Africa.

== Life ==
Tappenbeck was born as son of a Domänenpächter (tenant of an estate) and Oberamtmann (senior bailiff). He attended the Louisenstädtische Gymnasium in Berlin and the Cadet Corps in Kulm (Chełmno). He entered the 4th Westphalian Infantry Regiment No 17 as Portepee-Fähnrich (ensign with sword-knot). In 1880 he received his officer's commission.

Between 1884 and 1886 Tappenbeck explored the Congo region. In 1887 he was commissioned jointly with Richard Kund for the exploration of the back-country of Cameroon. His first advance was in November 1887, via Bipindi to the Nyong River until over the Sanaga River. Military important was primarily the conquest by force of Wataré, a sub-center of the Vute tribe.

In a second expedition together with Kund he founded in the territory of the Ewondo the station "Jaunde", from that the present capital of Cameroon Yaoundé emerged. The station was used primarily for scientific research, exploration of the flora and fauna in terms of economic exploitation, and as a base for further geographical expeditions. E.g., from this base Tappenbeck advanced as first Europeaon to the residence of Ngrang Gomtsé in Ndumba, the at that time most influential reign of the Vutes. With the foundation of Junda, that he – contrary to the instructions he had received from the Foreign Office – made significantly nearer to central Cameroon than planned, he quasi prepared an effective occupation of the back-country.

On the march returning to the coast, Tappenbeck died of malaria.

== Sources ==
- Erster Vorstoß in das Innere von Groß-Batanga aus. In: Mitteilungen von Forschungsreisenden und Gelehrten aus den deutschen Schutzgebieten. Vol. 1, 1888, p. 2–6
- Bericht über den äußeren Verlauf der Batanga-Expedition (Ende Oktober 1887 bis März 1888). In: Mitteilungen von Forschungsreisenden und Gelehrten aus den deutschen Schutzgebieten. Vol. 1, 1888, p. 6–22
- Letzter Bericht von Lieutenant Tappenbeck. In: Mitteilungen von Forschungsreisenden und Gelehrten aus den deutschen Schutzgebieten. Vol. 2, 1889, p. 114–119
- Reise von Lieutenant Tappenbeck von der Jaunde-Station über den Sannaga nach Ngila´s Residenz. In: Mitteilungen von Forschungsreisenden und Gelehrten aus den deutschen Schutzgebieten. Vol. 3, 1890, p. 109–113
- Nachruf für Lieutenant Tappenbeck. In: Mitteilungen von Forschungsreisenden und Gelehrten aus den deutschen Schutzgebieten. Vol. 2, 1889, p. 67–69
- Deutsches Koloniallexikon. Vol. 3, Leipzig 1920, p. 459
