= Hruzke, Kyiv Oblast =

Rural locality in Kyiv Oblast, Ukraine

Hruzke Грузьке
- Village
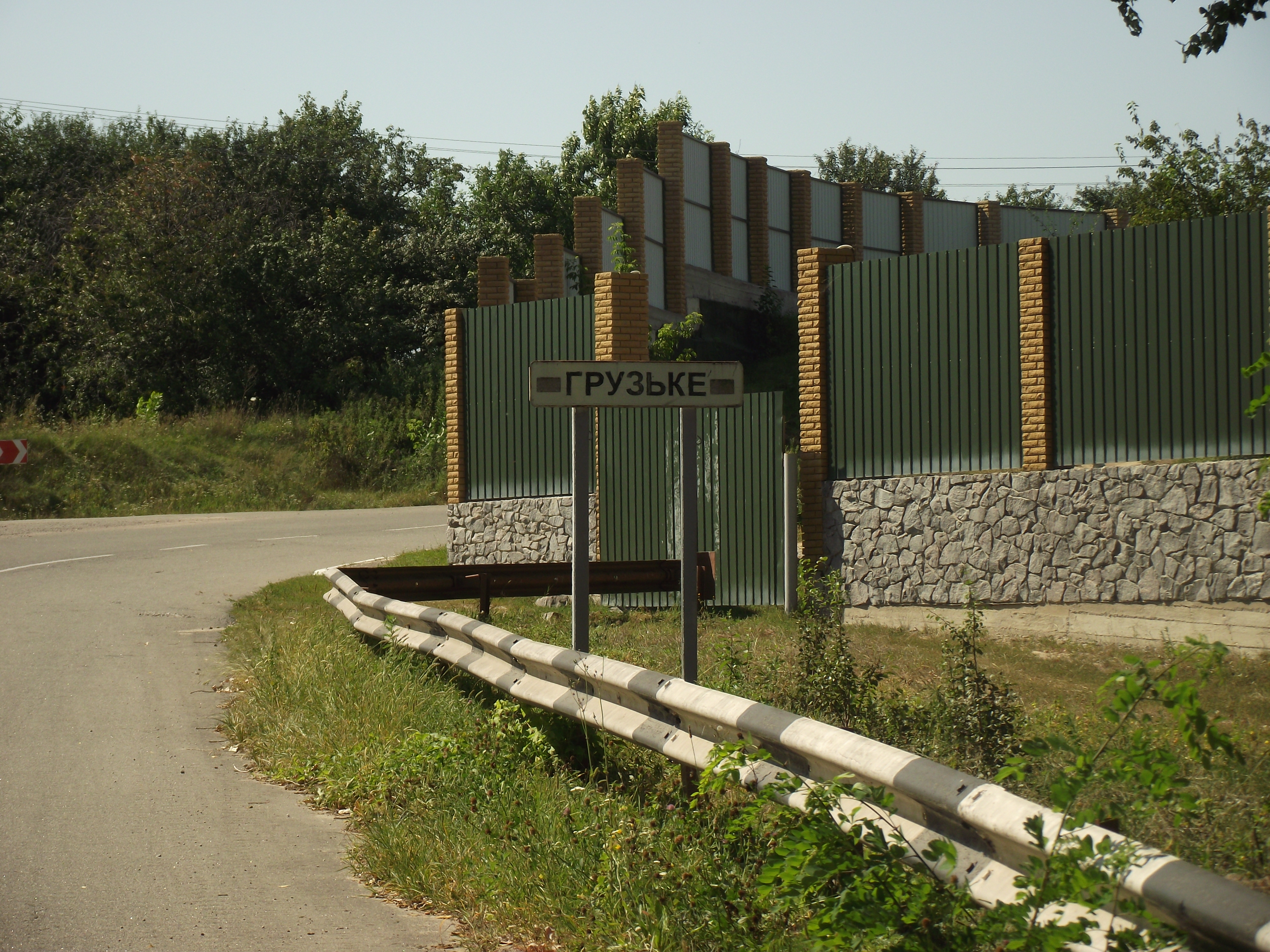

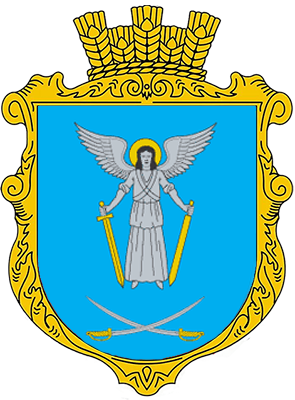
- Flag Coat of arms

- Location within Ukraine Location within Kyiv Oblast
- Coordinates: 50°17′52″N 29°45′17″E
- Country: Ukraine
- Oblast: Kyiv Oblast
- District: Fastiv Raion
- Founded: 1604 A.D.
- Hromada: Byshiv rural hromada
- Area: 0,483 km^{2} (186 sq mi)
- Elevation: 170 m (560 ft)
- Population (2013): 862
  - Density: 1.784/km^{2} (4.62/sq mi)
- Time zone: UTC+2 (EET)
  - Summer (DST): UTC+3 (EEST)
- Postal code: 08052
- Area code: +380 4578

Hruzke (Ukrainian: Грузьке) is a village in Fastiv Raion of Kyiv Oblast of north Ukraine. It belongs to Byshiv rural hromada, one of the hromadas of Ukraine.

== History ==
Hruzke History by Yevhen Buket

The village was established in 1604. Here was born Haydamak leader Ivan Bondarenko.

Until 18 July 2020, Hruzke belonged to Makariv Raion. The raion was abolished that day as part of the administrative reform of Ukraine, which reduced the number of raions of Kyiv Oblast to seven. The area of Makariv Raion was split between Bucha and Fastiv Raions, with Hruzke being transferred to Fastiv Raion.

== Geography ==
The village lies at an altitude of 170 metres and covers an area of 0.483 km^{2}. It has a population of about 862 people (2013).

== Gallery ==
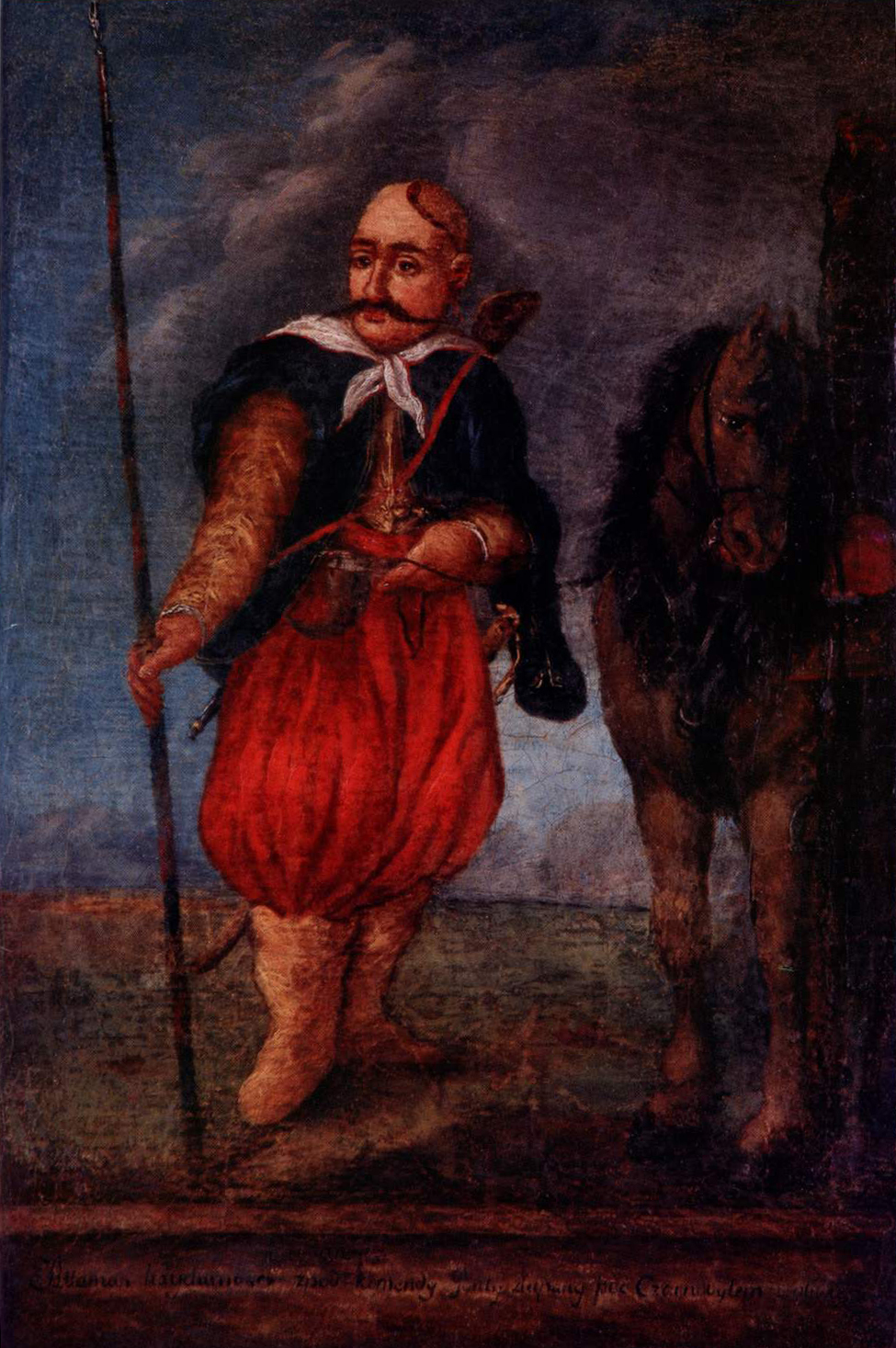
Haydamak leader Ivan Bondarenko

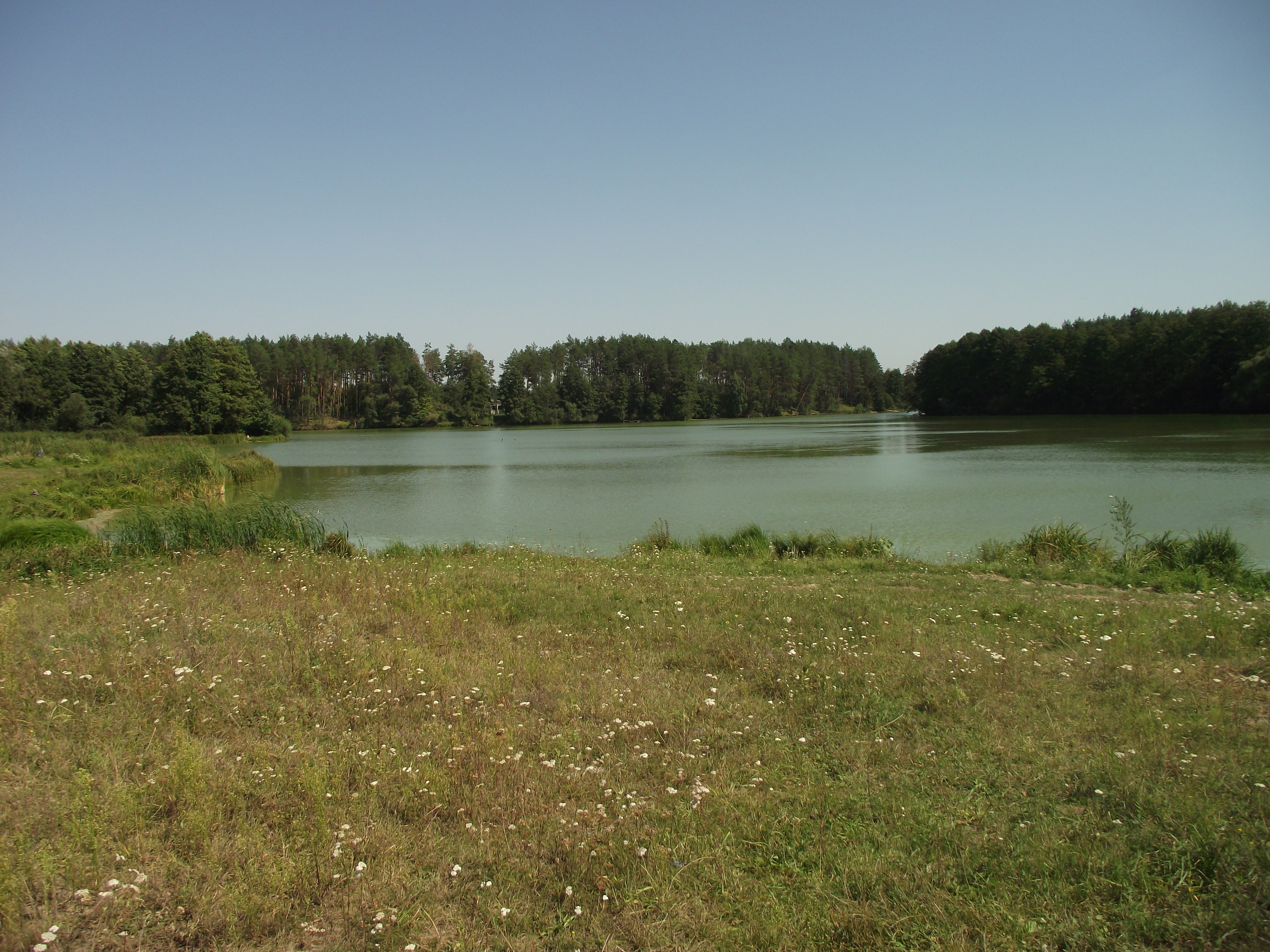
Pond on the river Syvka

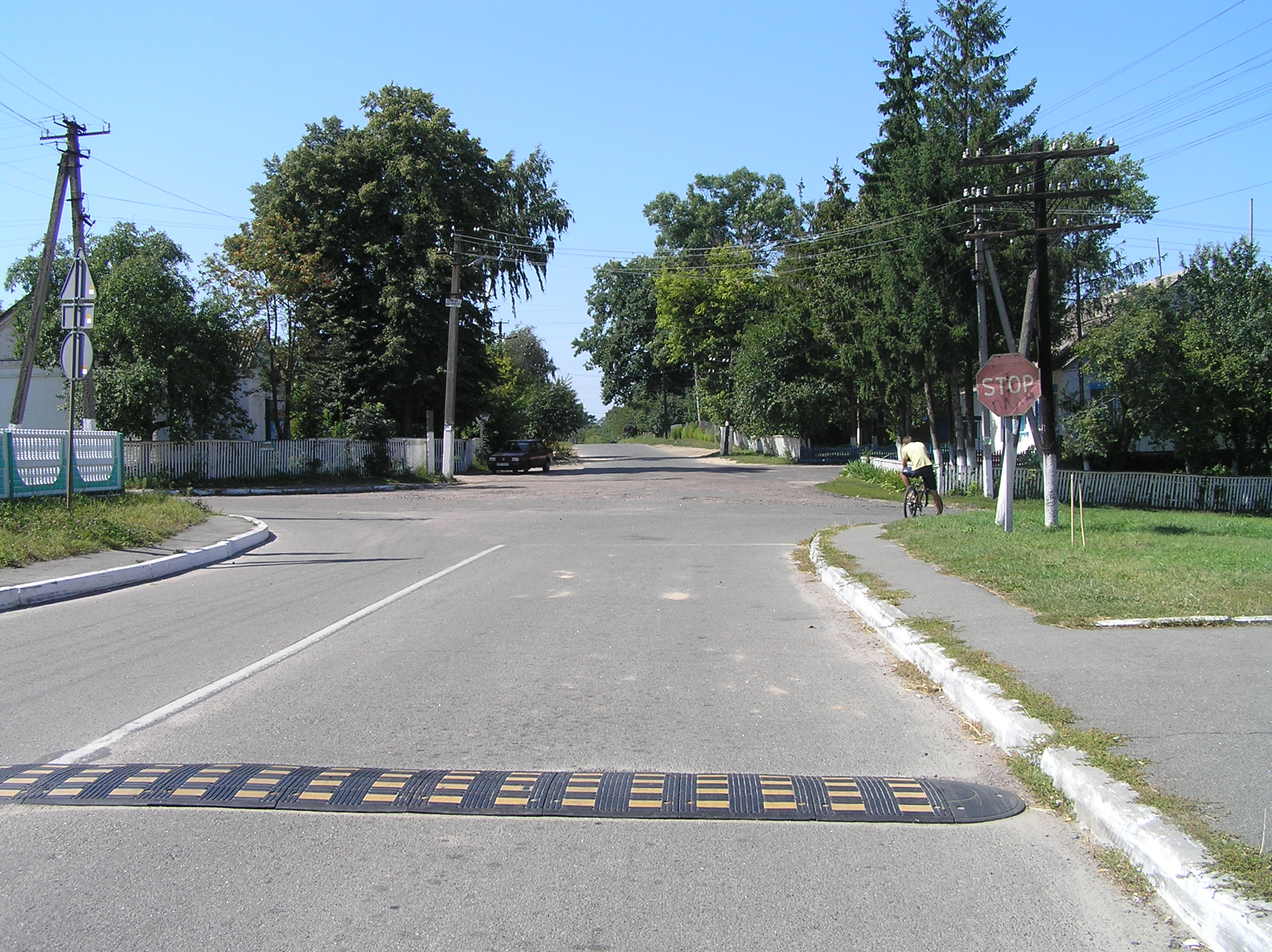
In the center of the village

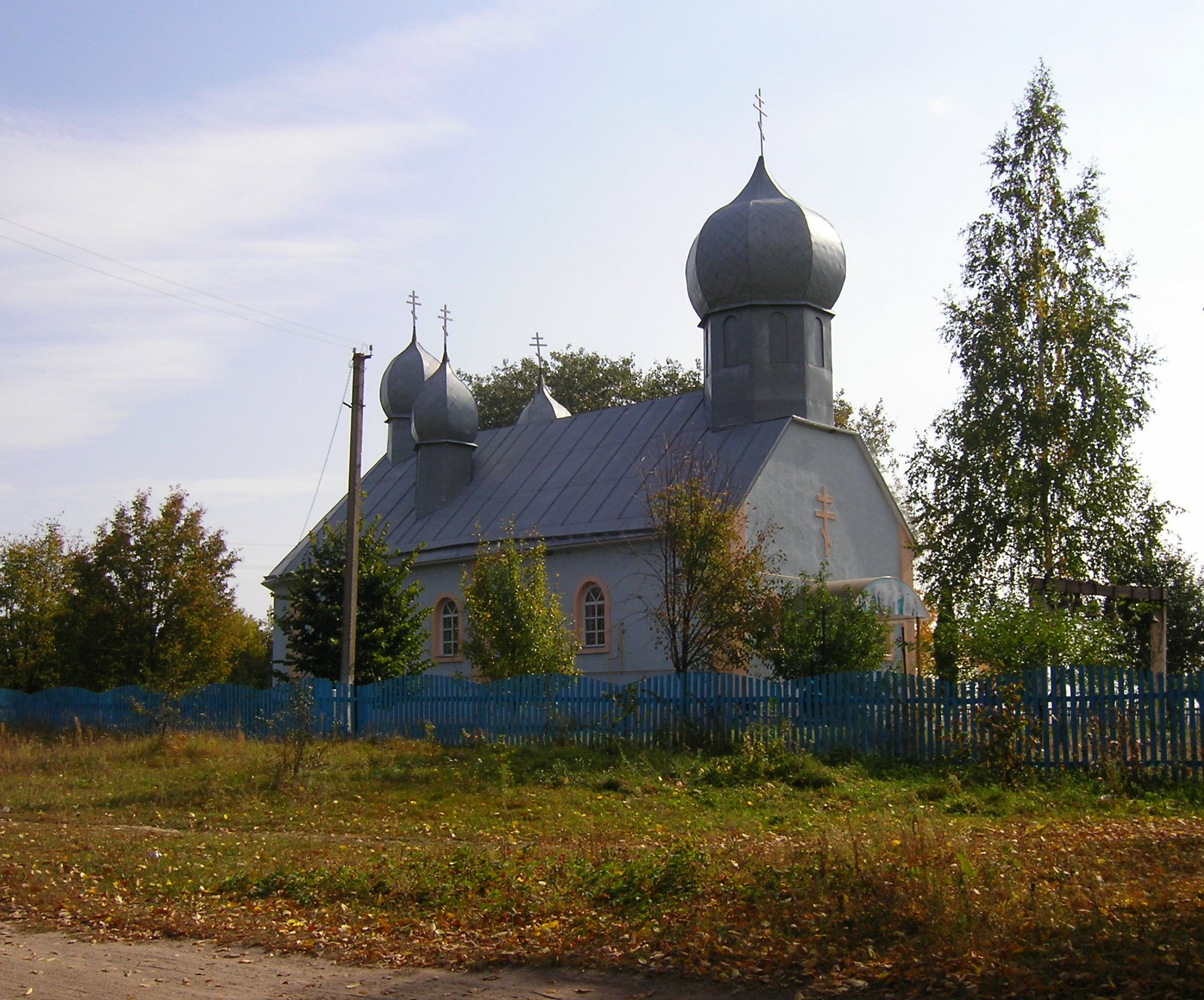
Orthodox Church

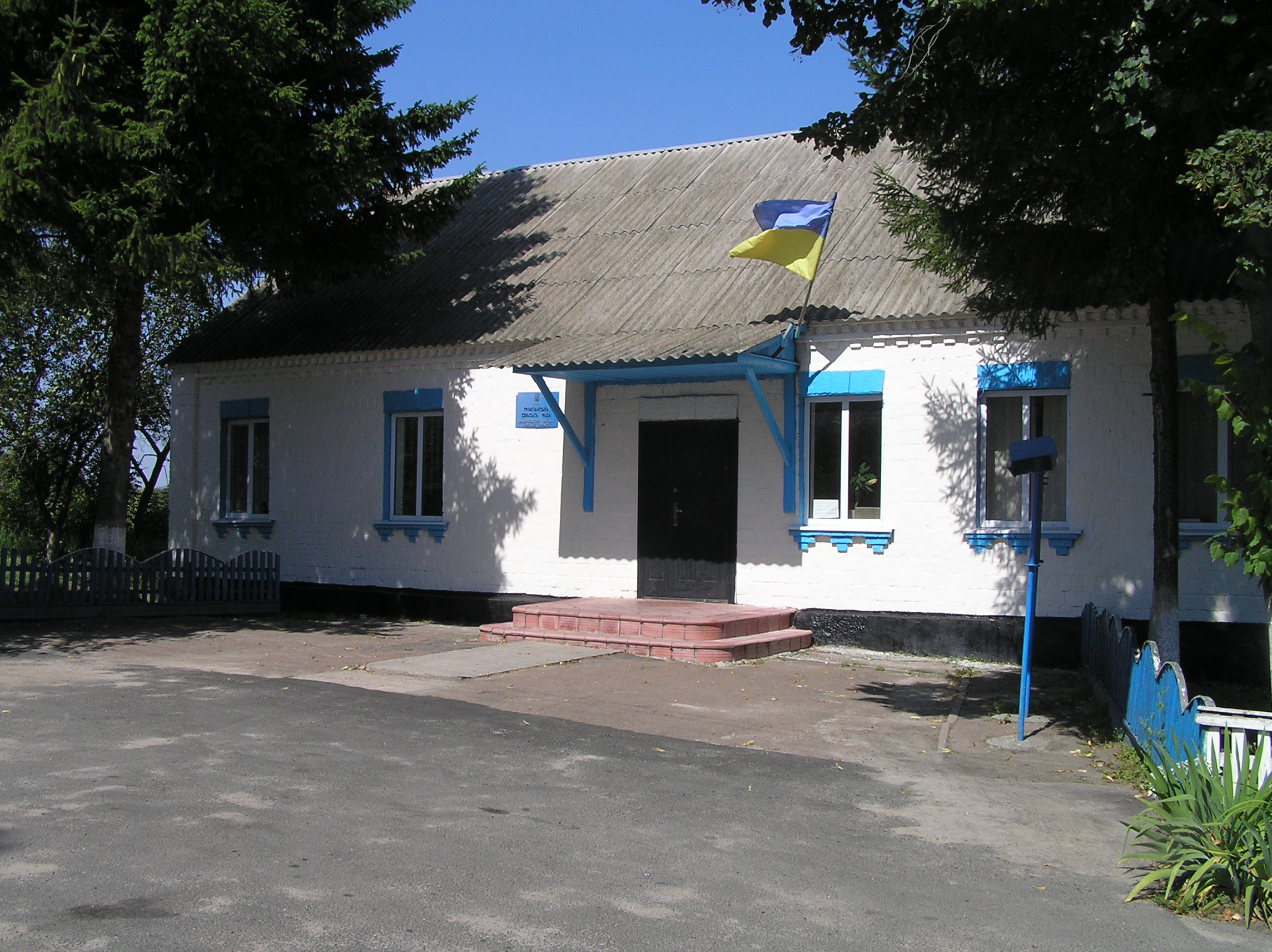
Village Council

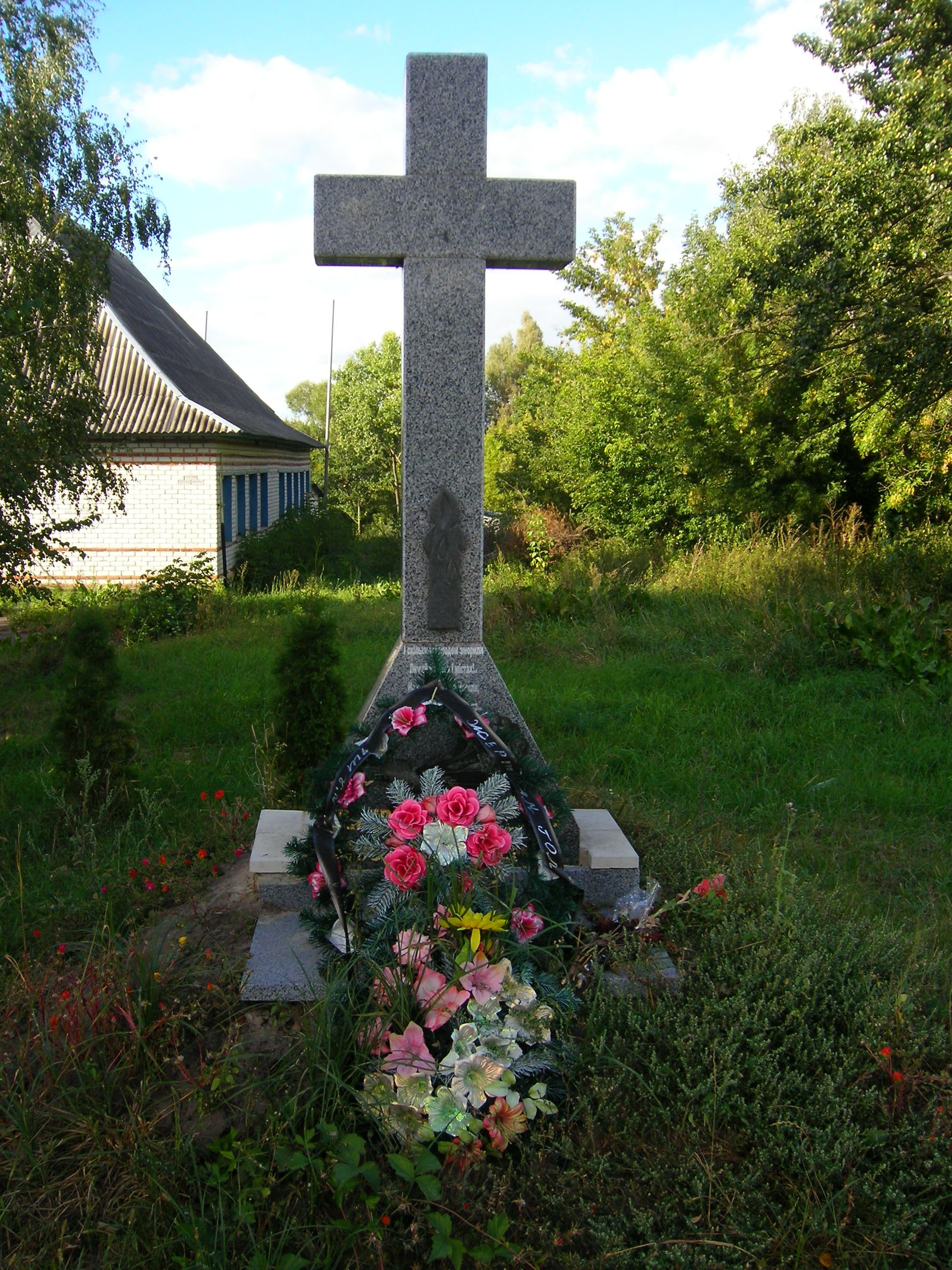
Monument to Holodomor victims
