= Richard Kund =

19th century German military officer and explorer in Africa

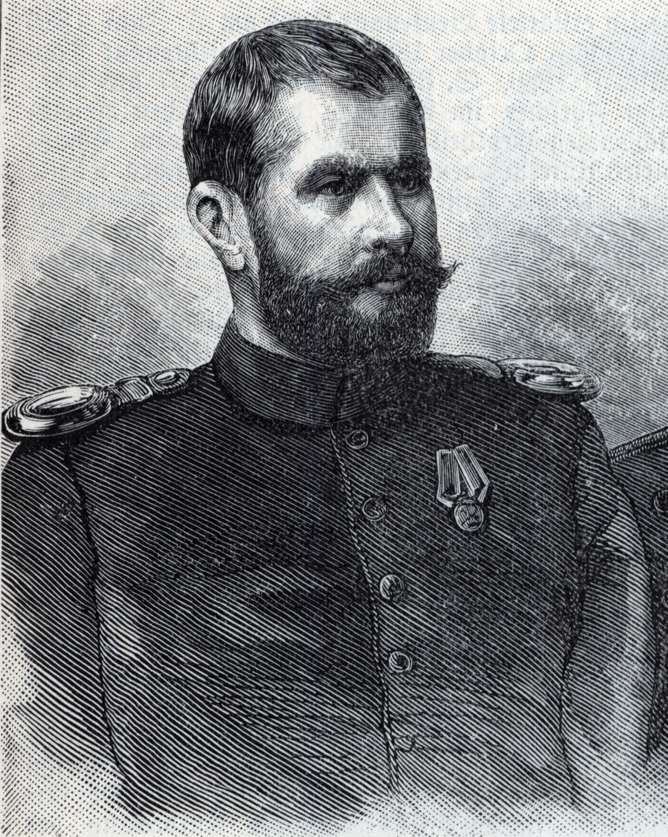
Wood engraving of Richard Kund from 1889

Richard Kund (born 19 June 1852 in Zielenzig, Neumark, Kingdom of Prussia; died 31 July 1904 in Sellin, Rügen) was a German officer and explorer of Africa. He co-founded the research station Jaunde, which later became Yaoundé, the capital of the Republic of Cameroon.

== Leben ==
In 1884/85, together with Hans Tappenbeck Kund took part in a research expedition in the southern Congo Basin as a Leutnant on behalf of the African Society. He was severely wounded during the expedition. In 1887, he participated in another research expedition with Tappenbeck, this time on behalf of Federal Foreign Office. During the expedition they founded the Jaunde scientific research station (today Yaoundé, the capital of the Republic of Cameroon) in 1888. The aim of the expedition was not only to explore the Hinterland of the German colony of Cameroon, but also to break the monopoly of the local transfer trade system in order to give European merchants direct access to producers and consumers in the interior.

Kund left Cameroon in 1889 for health reasons, was relieved of his command at the Foreign Office in March 1890, and transferred to the German General Staff. After Tappenbeck's death, he briefly went back to Africa. However, he had to return to Europe due to illness and Kurt von Morgen became the new leader of the expedition. The success of Morgens' expedition was based on the experiences Kund had passed on to him. Kund retired in 1891. That same year, he also left many objects to the Ethnological Museum of Berlin. After a long period of illness Kund died on Rügen in 1904.

Kund was awarded the Silver Karl Ritter Medal by the Gesellschaft für Erdkunde zu Berlin (Berlin Geographical Society) in 1890.

Richard Kund was the uncle of Herbert Kund, also a German officer. Herbert Kund also served in Cameroon from 1904 to 1907.

== Sources ==
- Günther Jantzen (1982). "Kund, Richard". Neue Deutsche Biographie (in German). Vol. 13. Berlin: Duncker & Humblot. pp. 288–289. (full text online).
- Heinrich Schnee (Hrsg.): Deutsches Kolonial-Lexikon, Leipzig 1920, Band II, S. 392 (archieved Entry for Kund in German)
