= Anne-Sophie =

Anne-Sophie is a feminine given name. Notable people with this name include:

- Ann Sophie (Ann-Sophie Dürmeyer, born 1990), German singer
- Anne-Sophie Barthet (born 1988), French alpine skier and soldier
- Anne-Sophie Bion, French film editor best known for her work in the 2011 silent film, The Artist
- Anne-Sophie Brasme (born 1984), French writer
- Anne-Sophie Calvez (born 1983), French figure skater
- Anne-Sophie de Kristoffy, French former figure skater
- Anne-Sophie Lapix (born 1972), French journalist and television presenter
- Anne-Sophie Le Paranthoën (born 1977), French international-level swimmer
- Anne Sophie Mathis, French female boxer
- Anne-Sophie Mondière (born 1979), French judoka
- Anne-Sophie Mutter (born 1963), German violinist
- Anne-Sophie Pelletier French politician
- Anne-Sophie Pic (born 1969), French chef
- Anne Sophie Reventlow (1693–1743), Queen of Denmark and Norway from 1721 to 1730
- Anne-Sophie Van Regemortel (born 1984), Belgian field hockey player
- Anne Sofie von Otter (born 1955), Swedish mezzo-soprano
- Princess Anna Sophie of Denmark (1647–1717), the eldest daughter of King Frederick III of Denmark and Sophie Amalie of Brunswick-Lüneburg

== See also ==
- Ann-Sophie
