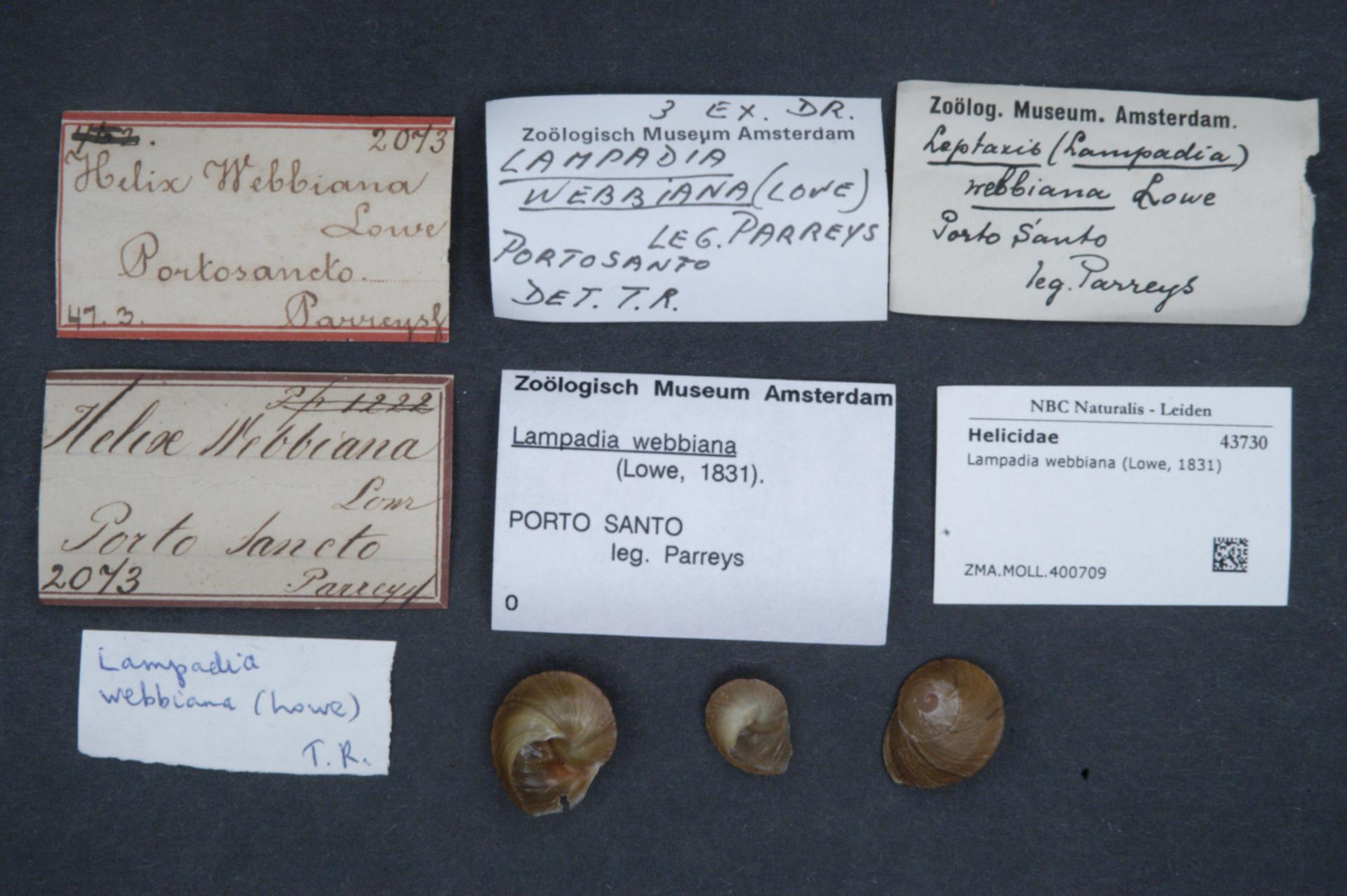
- Lampadia webbiana shells

Scientific classification
- Kingdom: Animalia
- Phylum: Mollusca
- Class: Gastropoda
- Order: Stylommatophora
- Family: Helicidae
- Genus: Lampadia; Albers, 1854

= Lampadia =

Genus of gastropods

Lampadia is a genus of air-breathing land snails, terrestrial pulmonate gastropod mollusks in the family Helicidae, the true snails.

== Species ==
Species within the genus Lampadia include:

- Lampadia webbiana (Lowe, 1831)
