= Yevhen Buket =

Ukrainian journalist and local historian (born 1981)

- Євген Букет
- Buket in 2022
- Born: 23 October 1981 (age 45); Kyiv, Ukrainian SSR, Soviet Union
- Education: Taras Shevchenko National University of Kyiv
- Occupations: Journalist, local historian, writer

Yevhen Vasylovych Buket (Ukrainian: Євген Васильович Букет; born 23 October 1981) is a Ukrainian journalist, writer and local historian. He is the author of numerous publications on the history of Kyiv Oblast, particularly the Haidamaka movement of the 18th century. From 2015 to 2022, he was editor-in-chief of the Ukrainian cultural newspaper Kultura i Zhyttia.

== Biography ==
Buket was born in Kyiv and spent his school years in the village of Hruzke in Kyiv Oblast. In 2004, he graduated from the Faculty of Mechanics and Mathematics at Taras Shevchenko National University of Kyiv.

While still a student, he began researching the history of his home region. His first book, Історія українського села Грузьке (History of the Ukrainian Village of Hruzke), was published in 2001. He subsequently wrote more than twenty books on the history of settlements in the former Makariv Raion.

Buket worked as a correspondent for the newspaper Makarivski Visti from 2006 to 2007. He later joined the cultural weekly Slovo Prosvity, where he worked as an online editor and subsequently as deputy editor-in-chief. In May 2015, he became editor-in-chief of Kultura i Zhyttia, a position he held until January 2022.

His historical research has included the Koliivshchyna uprising of 1768. Among his publications are Іван Бондаренко — останній полковник Коліївщини (2014), Швачка — фенікс українського духу (2016) and Семен Неживий — лицар Холодного Яру (2020).

During the Russian invasion of Ukraine, Buket worked as a correspondent for the Ukrainian military news agency ArmyInform. In 2025, he co-authored Шевченків сад. Родові дерева Моринців і Кирилівки, a genealogical study of the family of Ukrainian poet Taras Shevchenko.

A biobibliographical index published by the National Historical Library of Ukraine in 2022 documented 1,350 entries relating to Buket's work up to 23 February of that year. The bibliography includes 83 books and brochures, among them 11 authored monographs, as well as 39 scholarly articles, 57 popular-science journal articles, 893 newspaper articles and 188 articles published in online media.

== Wikimedia activities ==
Buket was chairman of the board of Wikimedia Ukraine from December 2011 to December 2012. He subsequently chaired the organization's audit commission until December 2013.

He was involved in establishing Wiki Loves Earth, a photography competition dedicated to natural heritage. Buket coordinated its first edition, held in Ukraine in 2013. The competition became international in 2014.

== Awards ==
Buket received the International Oles Honchar Literary Prize in 2008. In 2016, he was awarded the title of Honorary Local Historian of Ukraine by the National Union of Local Historians of Ukraine.

In 2018, he received the Viacheslav Chornovil Prize for his article Ханська Україна (Khan's Ukraine), published in the newspaper Krymska Svitlytsia.
