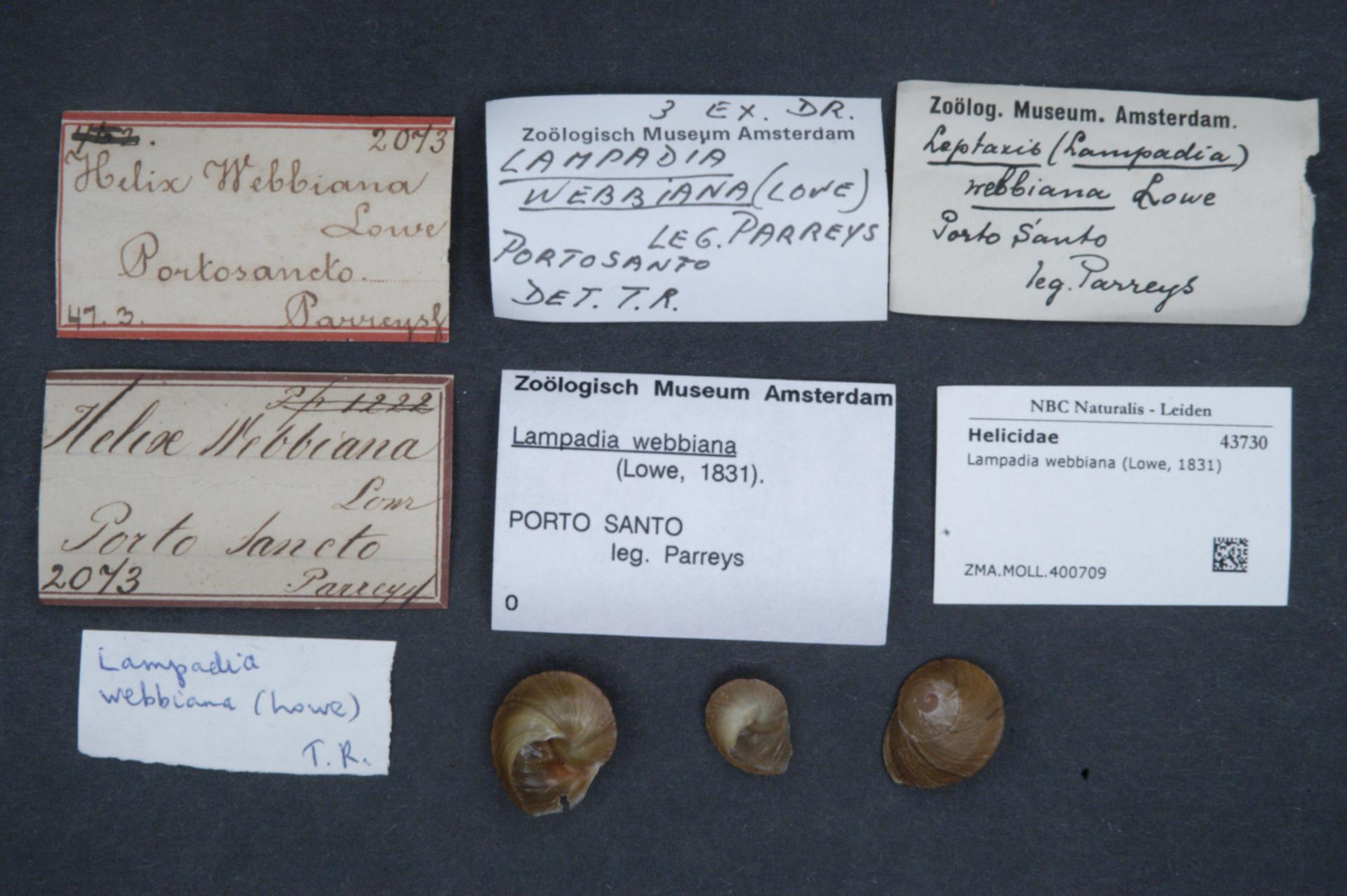
- Lampadia webbiana shells

Conservation status
- Endangered (IUCN 3.1)

Scientific classification
- Kingdom: Animalia
- Phylum: Mollusca
- Class: Gastropoda
- Order: Stylommatophora
- Family: Helicidae
- Genus: Lampadia
- Species: L. webbiana

Binomial name
- Lampadia webbiana (Lowe, 1831)

= Lampadia webbiana =

Species of gastropod

Lampadia webbiana is a species of land snail in the family Helicidae, the true snails. It is endemic to the Madeira archipelago, Portugal. The species is named after botanist Philip Barker-Webb.

This snail has only been found on Porto Santo Island and the nearby islet Ilhéu de Cima, but this population has not been refound and may be extirpated. On Porto Santo it is known only from three hills on the eastern side of the island, where it lives under rocks in grassy areas.

This species is threatened by introduced rodent predators, and possibly by degradation of its grassland habitat related to increasing tourism activity.
