= Lower Kachura Lake =

Lake in Gilgit-Baltistan, Pakistan

- زیریں کچورا جھیل
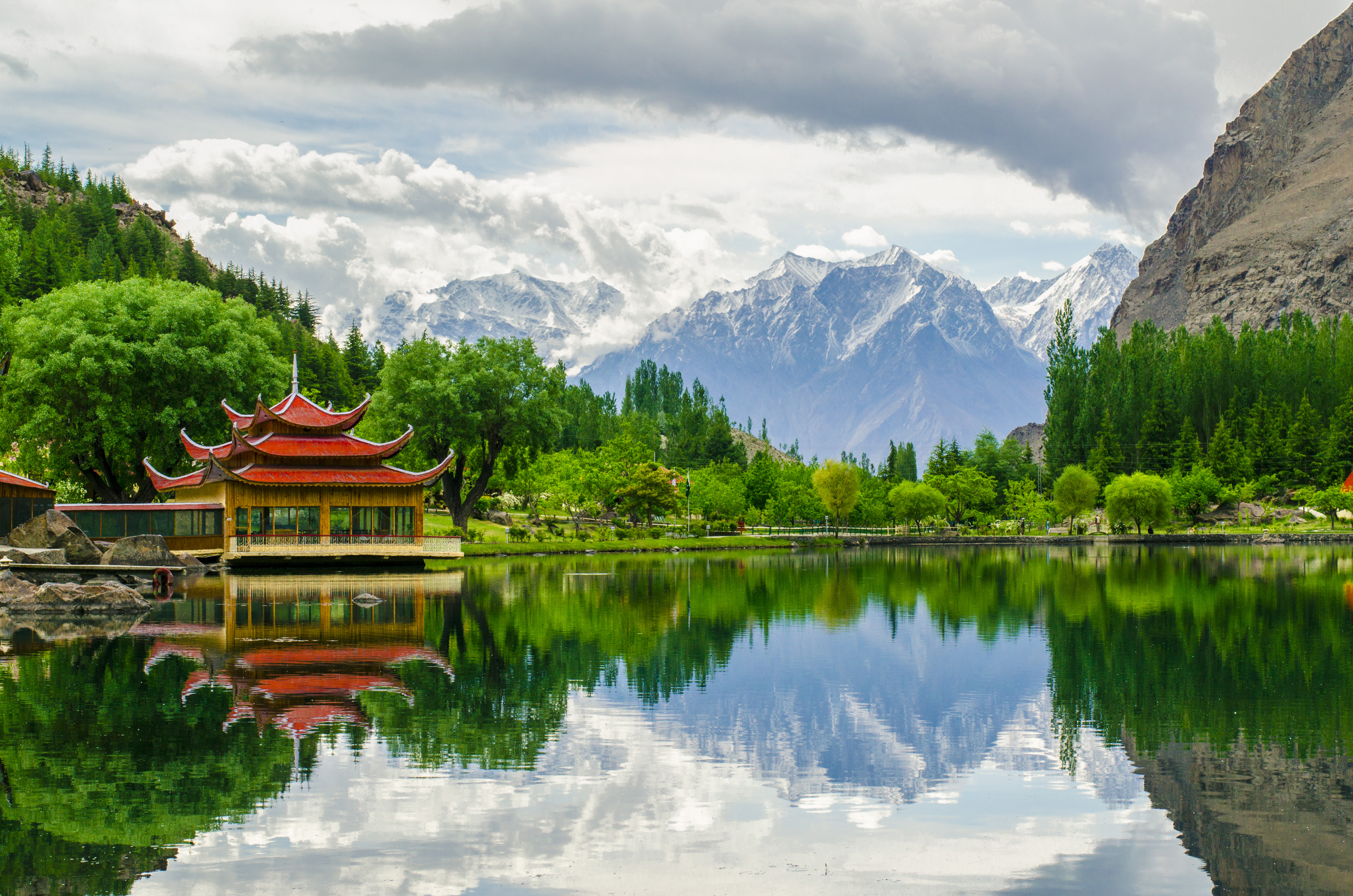
- View of the lakeside Shangrila Resort

- Location within Gilgit Baltistan Location within Pakistan Location within Asia
- Location: Skardu, Gilgit-Baltistan, Pakistan
- Coordinates: 35°25′36″N 75°27′18″E
- Average depth: 70 metres (230 ft)
- Surface elevation: 2,500 metres (8,200 ft)

Lower Kachura Lake, also known as Shangrila Lake, is a lake located near the city of Skardu in Gilgit-Baltistan, Pakistan. Situated at the height of 2,500 metres (8,200 ft), it has had an operational resort for tourists on its bank since 1983. Through the architectural work of the resort and the background Karakoram hills, the landscapes of the lake make it one of the attractive tourist destinations within northern Pakistan.

== Shangrila Resort ==
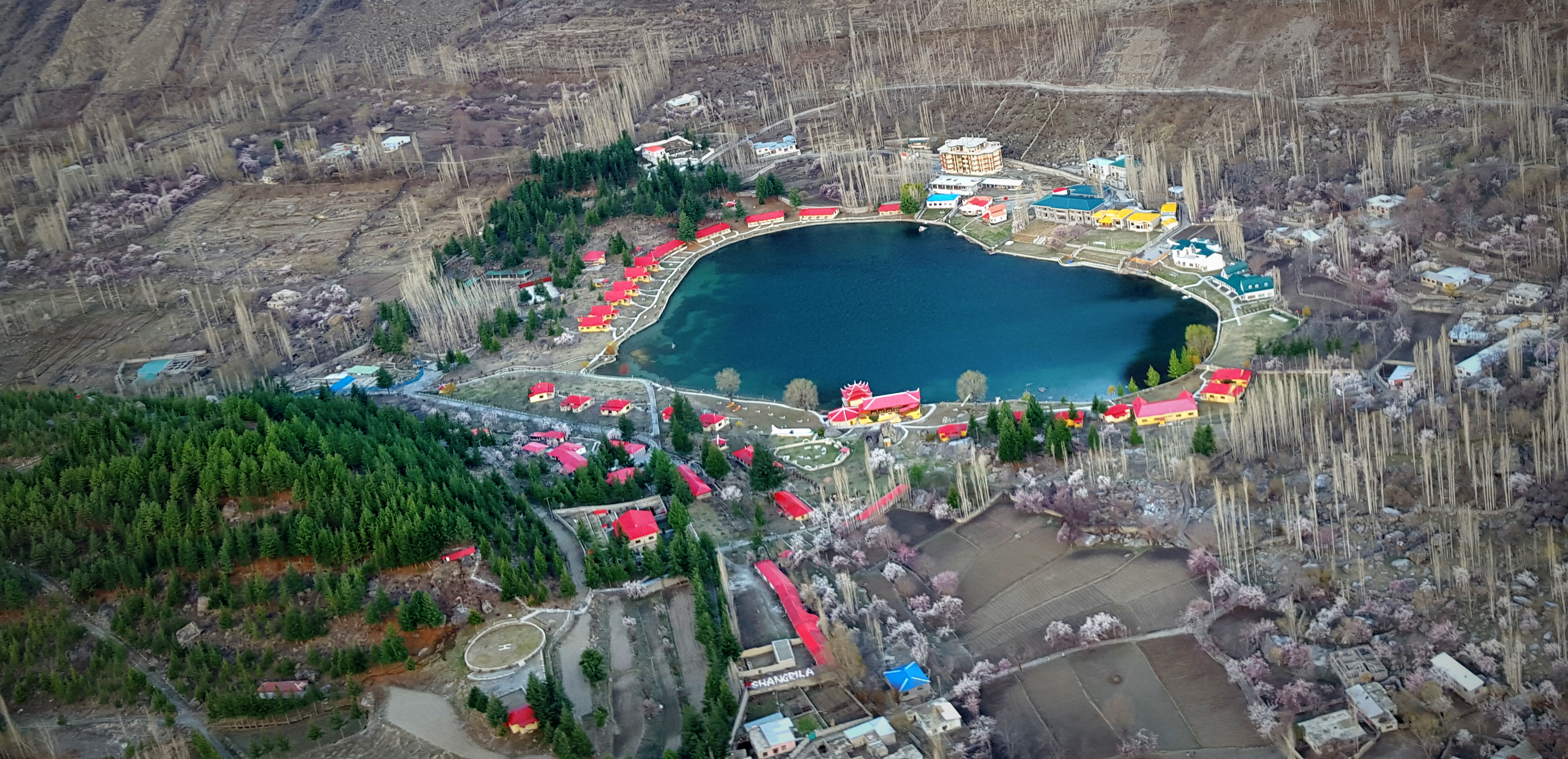
An aerial view of the lake and resort complex, the lake appears to be a heart-shaped waterbody from above.

Shangrila Resort Hotel was established in 1983 with the opening of the first resort hotel in Skardu. The Shangrila Resort Hotel was founded by Aslam Khan Afridi, a Pakistani military officer who served as the first commander of the Northern Scouts of the Pakistan Army. His son, Arif Aslam Khan is currently the chairman of the resort management. The resort is known for its restaurant that is built in the fuselage of an aircraft that had crashed nearby.

The resort was named after Shangri-La, an idyllic Himalayan paradise described in the 1933 novel Lost Horizon written by the British novelist James Hilton. In the novel, survivors of an early 1920s plane crash encounter Buddhist monks from a nearby temple who guide them to a lamasery filled with fruits and flowers. The monks claim to be hundreds of years old yet appear remarkably youthful. The seemingly earthly paradise is referred to as Shangri-La, a Tibetan-language word meaning, "heaven on Earth".

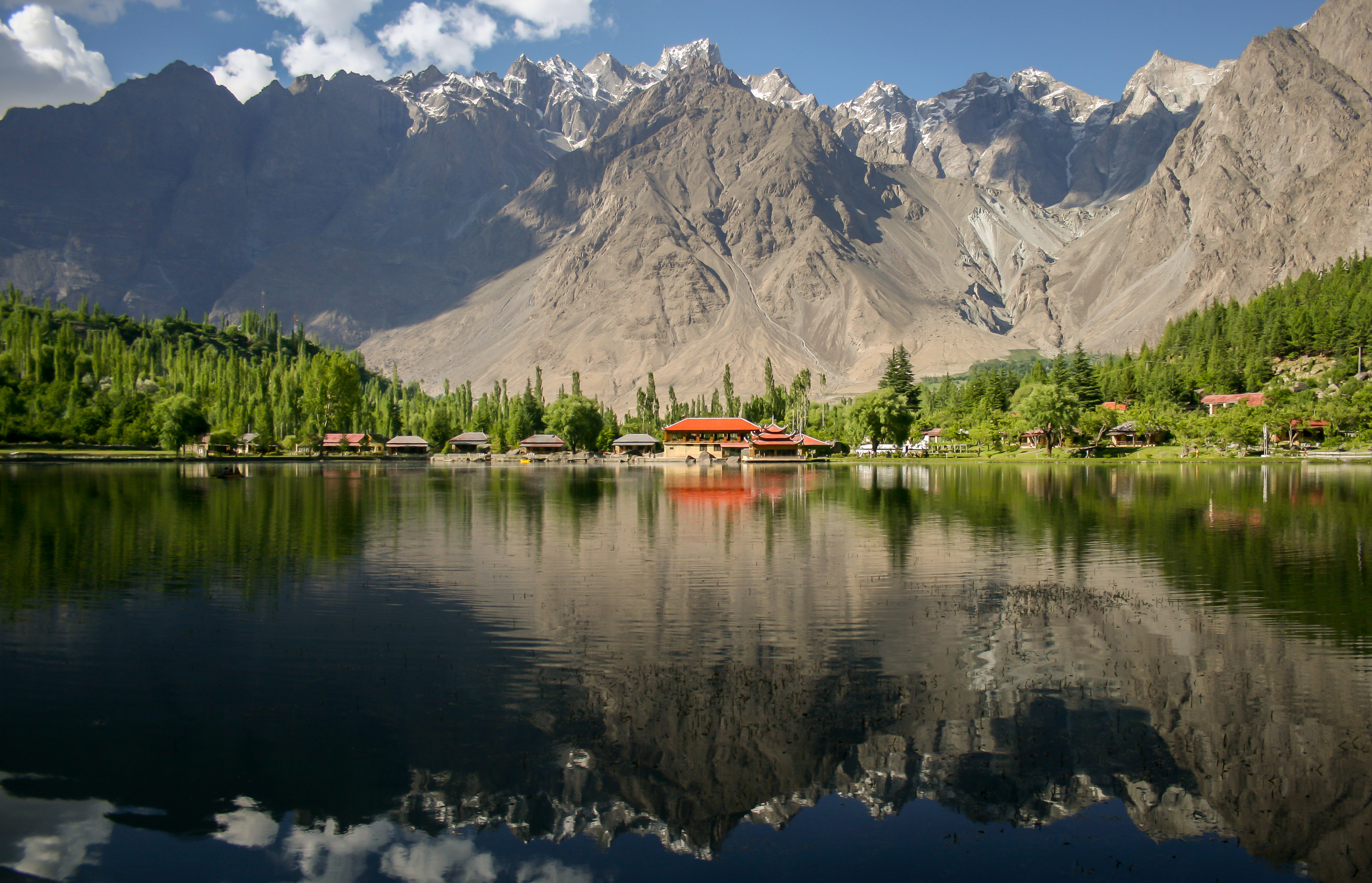
In 2015, this photo of Shangrila Resort was declared as the grand winner of the Wiki Loves Earth (2015), after a worldwide contest.
