= Havelaue =

- Municipality
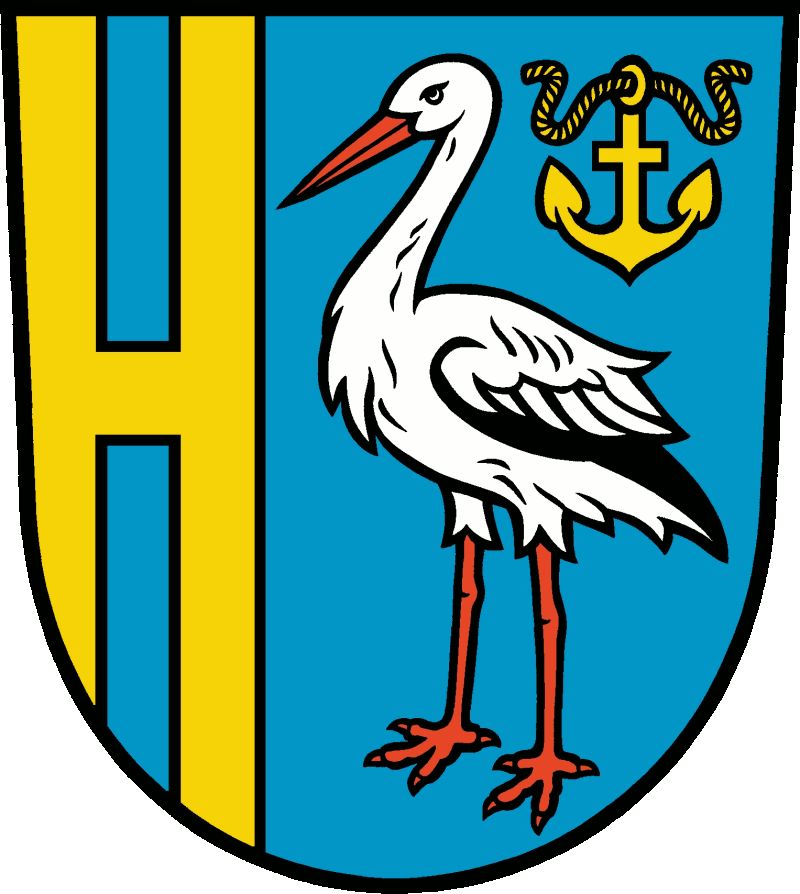
- Coat of arms

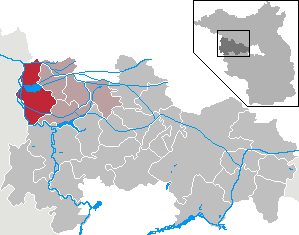
- Location of Havelaue within Havelland district
- Interactive map of Havelaue
- Location within Germany Location within Brandenburg
- Coordinates: 52°25′47″N 12°09′36″E
- Country: Germany
- State: Brandenburg
- District: Havelland
- Municipal assoc.: Rhinow
- Subdivisions: 5 Ortsteile

Government
  - Mayor (2024–29): Bill Neubüser (Left)

Area
  - Total: 74.32 km^{2} (28.70 sq mi)
- Elevation: 26 m (85 ft)

Population (2025-12-31)
  - Total: 880
  - Density: 12/km^{2} (31/sq mi)
- Time zone: UTC+01:00 (CET)
  - Summer (DST): UTC+02:00 (CEST)
- Postal codes: 14715
- Dialling codes: 033875. 033872
- Vehicle registration: HVL

Havelaue is a municipality in the Havelland district, in Brandenburg, Germany.

== Demography ==
Development of population since 1875 within the current boundaries (Blue line: Population; Dotted line: Comparison to population development of Brandenburg state; Grey background: Time of Nazi rule; Red background: Time of communist rule)

Havelaue: Population development
within the current boundaries (2013)

Year	Pop.	±% p.a.
1875	2,156	—
1890	2,043	−0.36%
1910	2,167	+0.30%
1925	2,011	−0.50%
1933	1,902	−0.69%
1939	1,826	−0.68%
1946	2,745	+6.00%
1950	2,546	−1.86%
1964	1,686	−2.90%
1971	1,636	−0.43%
1981	1,239	−2.74%
1985	1,237	−0.04%
1989	1,196	−0.84%
1990	1,164	−2.68%
1991	1,118	−3.95%
1992	1,116	−0.18%
1993	1,114	−0.18%
1994	1,111	−0.27%
1995	1,075	−3.24%
1996	1,028	−4.37%

Year	Pop.	±% p.a.
1997	1,074	+4.47%
1998	1,064	−0.93%
1999	1,031	−3.10%
2000	1,013	−1.75%
2001	1,014	+0.10%
2002	997	−1.68%
2003	1,014	+1.71%
2004	1,036	+2.17%
2005	1,017	−1.83%
2006	999	−1.77%
2007	998	−0.10%
2008	994	−0.40%
2009	988	−0.60%
2010	957	−3.14%
2011	926	−3.24%
2012	905	−2.27%
2013	885	−2.21%
2014	877	−0.90%
2015	878	+0.11%
2016	869	−1.03%

== Notable people from Havelaue ==
- Hans Tappenbeck (1861–1889), military officer

== See also ==
- Gülper See
