= Culture and Life =

Ukrainian weekly newspaper

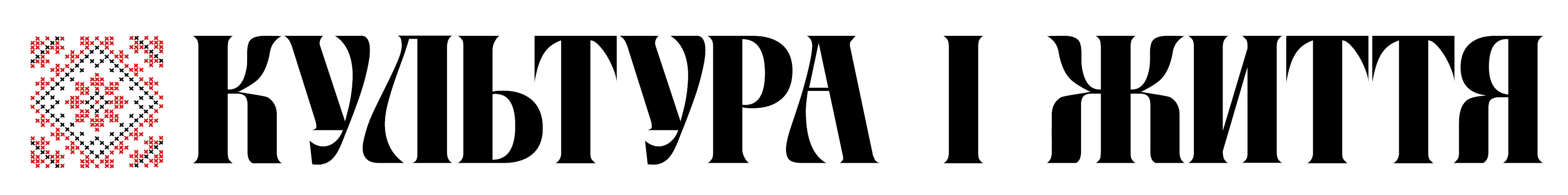
- One of the issues of the newspaper Culture and Life
- Type: Weekly newspaper
- Format: B4
- Owner: Ministry of Culture of Ukraine
- Founder(s): Ministry of Culture of Ukraine, the Central Committee of Trade Union of Culture of Ukraine, and the labor collective editorial
- Publisher: SE «National newspaper and magazine publishing»
- Editor: Yevhen Buket (since 2015)
- Founded: October 7, 1923
- Language: Ukrainian
- Headquarters: Vasylkivska str., 1 Kyiv, Ukraine 03040
- Country: Ukraine
- Circulation: 5000
- ISSN: 2519-4429
- Website: www.cultua.media

Culture and Life (Ukrainian: Культура і життя, pronounced [kʊlʲˈturɐ i ʒɪˈtʲːɑ]) is a national Ukrainian weekly newspaper.

== History ==
Founded in January 1913 by Hnat Khotkevych. On October 7, 1923, re-founded under the title Literature, Science and Art as an annex to the newspaper Izvestia VUTSVK, its first chief editor was Vasyl Ellan-Blakytny.

In 1925, became part of the newspaper Culture and Everyday Life, which was published in 1925—1928 as an addition to Izvestia VUTSVK. From January 1929 to November 1930 was called Literature and Art. Under the same name was issued in 1941–1944 in various cities — Kyiv, Voroshilovgrad, Ufa, Moscow, Kharkiv, again in Kyiv. In 1945—1954 it was called Soviet Art, in 1955–1964, Soviet Culture. The modern name, Culture and Life, was adopted May 3, 1965.

After the Independence of Ukraine — it became the official press organ of the Ministry of Culture of Ukraine. Re-founded by the Ministry of Culture of Ukraine, the Central Committee of Trade Union of Culture of Ukraine, and the labor collective editorial.

Since 2017 it has been published under CC BY 3.0 license.

=== Reforming in 2019 ===
The publications of the National Newspaper and Magazine Publishing House, including the newspaper Kultura i Zhyttia, were not reformed under the Law of Ukraine "On Reforming State and Municipal Print Media" due to the refusal of the Ministry of Culture of Ukraine to withdraw from the co-founders.

On February 14, 2019, the newspaper "Culture and Life" received a new certificate of state registration No. 23788-13628R. The new founder of the newspaper was the Limited Liability Company "Ukrainian Culture Publishing House", established on December 28, 2018, by the editors of the National Newspaper and Magazine Publishing House.

On April 24, 2019, the National Union of Journalists of Ukraine included the Minister of Culture of Ukraine Yevhen Nyschuk in the anti-rating "Enemies of Press Reform" for obstructing the reform of Ukrainian Culture, Music, Culture and Life and Crimean Room.
