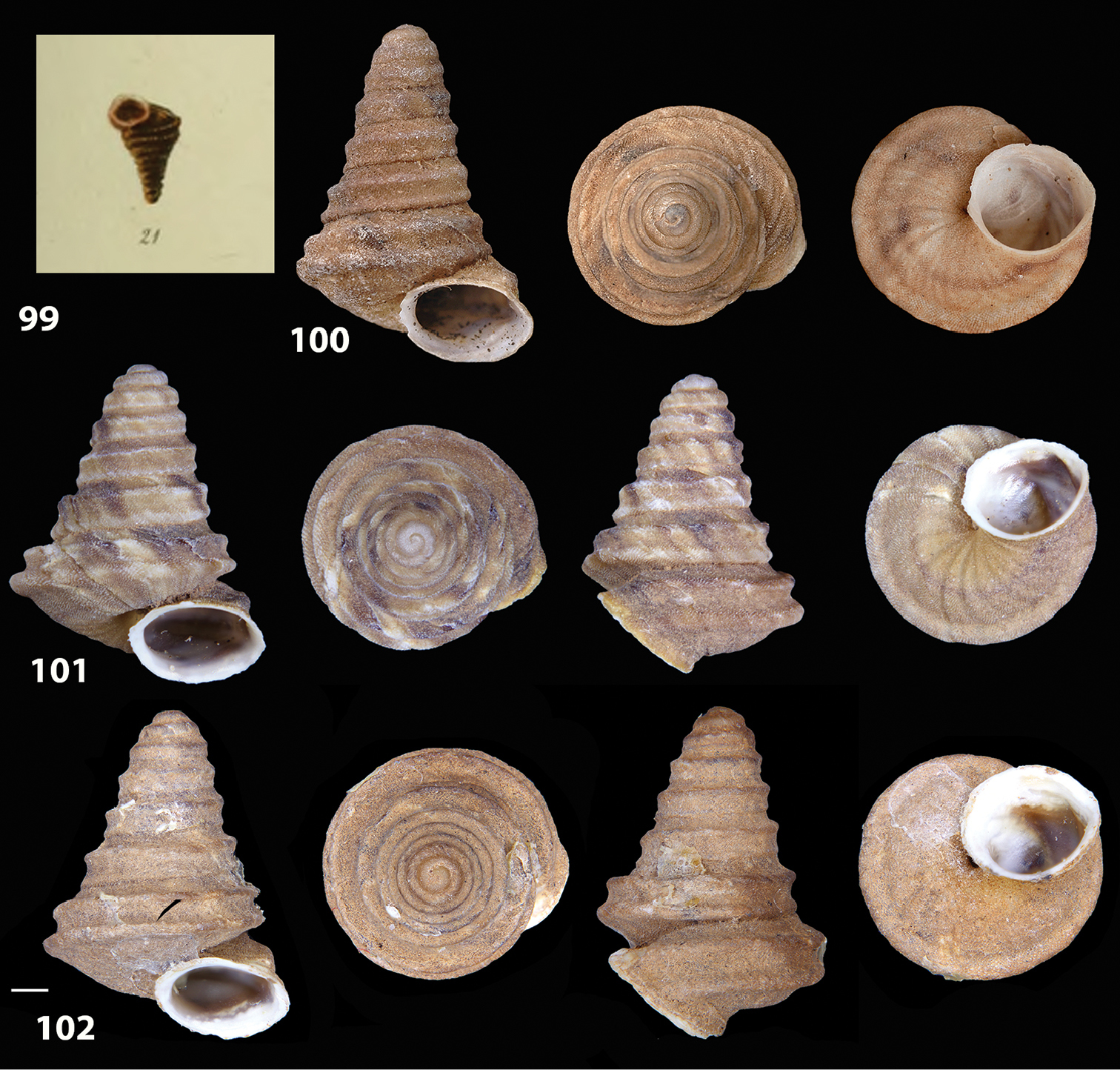
- Shell of Wollastonaria turricula

Conservation status
- Vulnerable (IUCN 3.1)

Scientific classification
- Kingdom: Animalia
- Phylum: Mollusca
- Class: Gastropoda
- Order: Stylommatophora
- Family: Geomitridae
- Genus: Wollastonaria
- Species: W. turricula

Binomial name
- Wollastonaria turricula (R. T. Lowe, 1831)

Synonyms
- Discula turricula; Geomitra turricula Pilsbry, 1895; Ochthephila (Hystricella) turricula (Lowe, 1831); Helix turricula R. T. Lowe, 1831; Helix (Hystricella) turricula Lowe, 1855; Helix (Hystricella) turricula var. pererosa Wollaston, 1878; Wollastonia turricula (R. T. Lowe, 1831) (superseded generic combination)

= Wollastonaria turricula =

Species of gastropod

Wollastonaria turricula is a species of small, air-breathing land snail, a terrestrial pulmonate gastropod mollusk in the family Geomitridae.

This species is indigenous to the Madeira archipelago, where it only occurs on the islet Ilhéu de Cima.

== Shell description ==
The shell of these snails is shaped like a discus, or a lens, with a sharp edge around the periphery of the whorls. It may be easily distinguished, through external morphology, from all Hystricella and Wollastonia species from its "peculiarly turreted shell".

== Distribution and Ecology ==
Hystricella turricula is endemic to the coastal slopes and plateaus on the islet Ilhéu de Cima on the southeastern coast of Porto Santo. The species occurs under volcanic rocks and debris scattered in open fields. The local form pererosa occurs on steep low-elevation slopes. Referenced collecting localities of De Mattia, Neiber & Groh, 2015 include: Quaternary slope deposits on the southwestern coast of Ilhéu de Cima, 33°03'15"N 16°17'02"W, 40 m; Ilhéu de Cima, top, under stones, 33°03'13"N 16°16'48"W, approx. 100 m.

== Conservation status ==
This species is mentioned in annex IV of the Habitats Directive. De Mattia, Neiber & Groh, 2015 consider this species to be Critically Endangered under criteria B1a,b(ii,v),2a,b(ii,v), as the species' extent of occurrence is less than 1 km^{2}, and is imperiled by grazing and various unrecorded factors. Significant populational declines have been recorded, and the species is now restricted to one location on a high-altitude plateau.
