= Wiki Loves Monuments =

Annual international photography contest

- Official logo of Wiki Loves Monuments

- All countries that participated at least once in a Wiki Loves Monuments competition in 2010–2022
- Genre: Photography
- Begins: 1 September
- Ends: 31 October
- Location: Worldwide
- Years active: 15
- Inaugurated: 2010
- Most recent: 2025
- Participants: Photographers
- Organiser: Wikipedia community members
- Website: WikiLovesMonuments.org

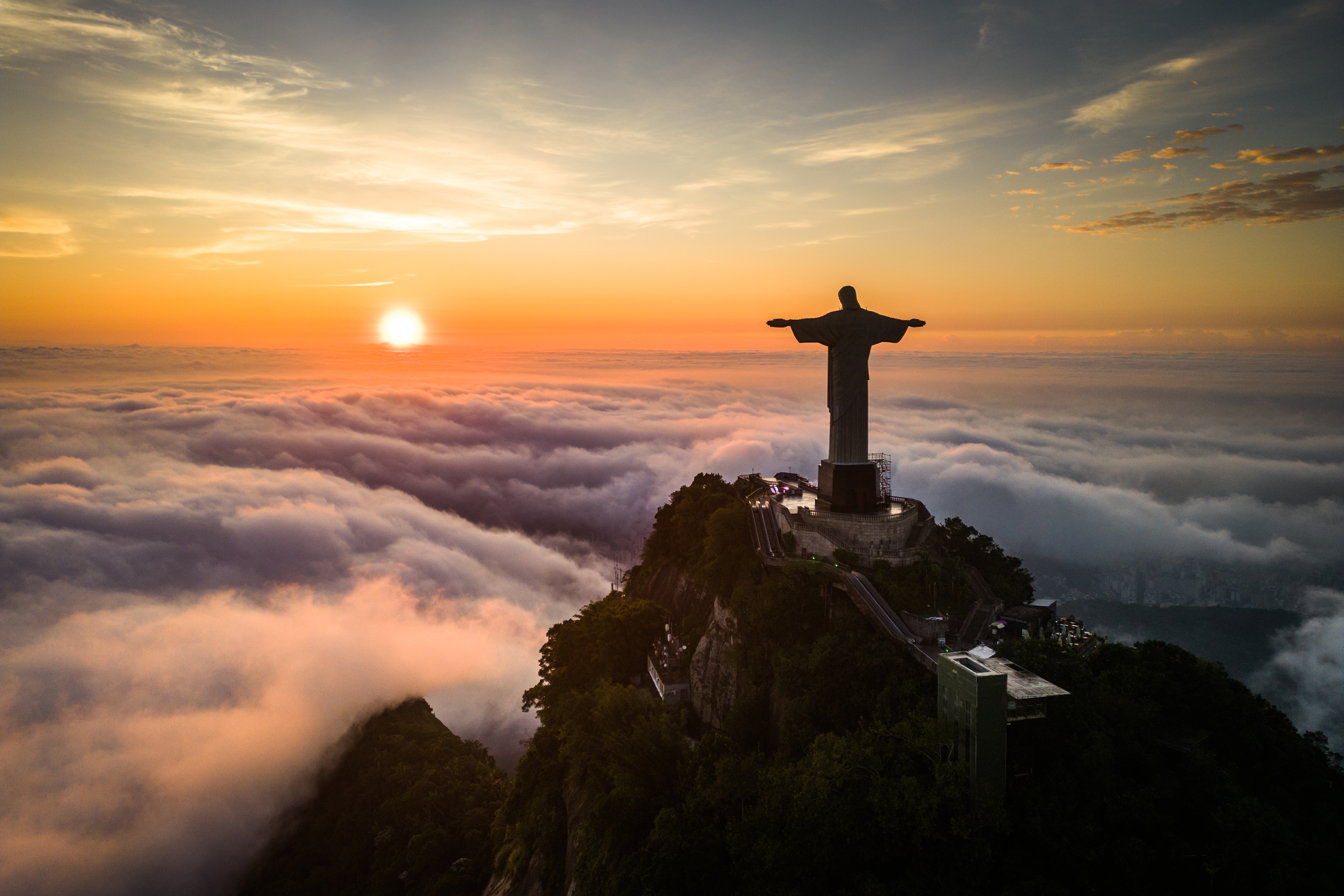
WLM 2024 winner:Christ the Redeemer over the clouds by Donatas Dabravolskas

Wiki Loves Monuments (WLM) is an annual international photographic competition held during the month of September, organised worldwide by Wikipedia community members with the help of local Wikimedia affiliates across the globe. Participants take pictures of local historical monuments and heritage sites in their region, and upload them to Wikimedia Commons. The aim of this event is to highlight the heritage sites of the participating countries with the goal to encourage people to capture pictures of these monuments, and to put them under a free licence which can then be re-used not only in Wikipedia but everywhere by everyone.

The first Wiki Loves Monuments competition was held in 2010 in the Netherlands as a pilot project. The next year it spread to other countries in Europe and according to the Guinness Book of Records, the 2011 edition of the Wiki Loves Monuments broke the world record for the largest photography competition. In 2012, the competition was extended beyond Europe, with a total of 35 participating countries. During Wiki Loves Monuments 2012, more than 350,000 photographs of historic monuments were uploaded by more than 15,000 participants. In 2013, the Wiki Loves Monuments competition was held across six continents including Antarctica and had official participation from more than fifty countries around the world. The 2016 edition of WLM was supported by UNESCO and saw 10,700 contestants from 43 countries who submitted 277,000 photos.

== History ==
Wiki Loves Monuments is the successor to Wiki Loves Art, which was held in the Netherlands in 2009. The original WLM contest for "Rijksmonuments" (Dutch for "national monuments") encouraged photographers to seek out Dutch National Heritage Sites. The Rijkmonuments include architecture and objects of general interest recognized for their beauty, scientific, and/or cultural importance. Such locations as the Drenthe archeological sites, the Noordeinde Royal Palace in The Hague, and the houses along the canals of Amsterdam were part of the more than 12,500 photographs submitted during the first event.

This success generated interest in other Europe countries, and through a collaboration with the European Heritage Days, 18 states with the help of local Wikimedia chapters participated in the 2011 competition, uploading nearly 170,000 images by its conclusion. The Guinness Book of Records recognizes the 2011 edition of Wiki Loves Monuments as the largest photography competition in the world with 168,208 pictures uploaded to Wikimedia Commons by more than 5,000 participants. In total, some 171,000 photographs were contributed from 18 participants countries of Europe. Germany, France and Spain contributed the highest number of photographs. A photo from Romania won the first international prize, whereas Estonia secured second and Germany third position in WLM 2011.

In 2012, the Wiki Loves Monuments competition had official participation of more than thirty countries and regions around the world: Andorra, Argentina, Austria, Belarus, Belgium, Canada, Catalonia, Chile, Colombia, the Czech Republic, Denmark, Estonia, France, Germany, Ghana, India, Israel, Italy, Kenya, Luxembourg, Mexico, the Netherlands, Norway, Panama, the Philippines, Poland, Romania, Russia, Serbia, Slovakia, Spain, South Africa, Sweden, Switzerland, Ukraine, and the United States. In total 363,000 photos were contributed from 35 participants countries. Germany, Spain, and Poland contributed the highest number of photographs. A picture of the Tomb of Safdarjung from Delhi, India, won the contest which saw more than 350,000 contributions. Spain secured second and Philippines third position in the 2012 edition of the annual WLM photo contest.

In 2013, the Wiki Loves Monuments competition had the official participation of more than fifty countries from all six continents including Antarctica. Among the new participant nations were Algeria, Chine, Azerbaijan, Hong Kong, Jordan, Venezuela, Thailand, Taiwan, Nepal, Tunisia, Egypt, the United Kingdom, war-torn Syria and many others. In total, some 370,000 photos were contributed from more than 52 participating countries. Germany, Ukraine, and Poland contributed the highest number of photographs. Switzerland won the first international prize, whereas Taiwan secured second and Hungary third position in the 2013 edition of WLM.

The 2014 version of the contest saw more than 8,750 contestants in 41 countries across the globe, who submitted more than 308,000 photographs. Pakistan, Macedonia, Ireland, Republic of Kosovo, Albania, Palestine, Lebanon, and Iraq made their debut in 2014. In Pakistan, more than 700 contestants from across the country submitted over 12,000 photographs.

The 2015 edition saw more than 6,200 contestants participating from 33 countries, with over 220,000 photo submissions throughout the month of September.

The 2016 edition of WLM was supported by UNESCO and saw 10,700 contestants from 43 countries who submitted 277,000 photos.

In the 2017 edition, 52 countries participated and nearly 245 000 photographs were obtained. The following year, 2018, the number of participating countries rose to 56 countries that donated more than 257 000 photographs. In the 2019 edition, the list of participating countries dropped to 48 and almost 213,000 images were collected.

In 2020, the competition was convened with some changes due to the COVID-19 pandemic, being held in some countries in October or November instead of its traditional September venue.10 Despite the difficulties, participants from 51 countries donated more than 230,000 photographs.

In 2022 the Ukrainian organising committee of the competition withdrew from the contest in protest against the possibility to admit photos of cultural heritage monuments from Russia (they stated) "a country that is waging war against Ukraine and killing thousands of Ukrainians, as well as systematically destroying and stealing Ukrainian monuments of culture, architecture, and archeology." A request of the Ukrainian team to exclude Russia from the contest was not granted.

== Winners ==
The following is a list of international first prize winners of Wiki Loves Monuments:

| Year | Photo | Photographer | Country | Description |
|---|---|---|---|---|
| 2010 | | Rudolphous | Netherlands | Vijzelstraat 31 in Amsterdam |
| 2011 | | Mihai Petre | Romania | Winter picture of Chiajna Monastery, outskirts of Bucharest. |
| 2012 | | Pranav Singh | India | Tomb of Safdarjung, New Delhi |
| 2013 | | David Gubler | Switzerland | A RhB Ge 4/4 II with a push–pull train crosses the Wiesen Viaduct between Wiesen and Filisur |
| 2014 | | Konstantin Brizhnichenko | Ukraine | Holy Mountains Monastery, Sviatohirsk |
| 2015 | | Marco Leiter | Germany | Westerheversand Lighthouse, Westerhever |
| 2016 | | Ansgar Koreng | Germany | The entrance hall of the Regional court, Berlin |
| 2017 | | Prashant Khatore | India | The Khandoba Temple, Pune |
| 2018 | | Alireza Akhaghi | Iran | Sheikh Lotfollah Mosque, Isfahan |
| 2019 | | Marian Naworski | Poland | Abandoned Evangelical Church, Stawiszyn |
| 2020 | | Farzin Izaddoust dar | Iran | Saint John's Church, Sohrol |
| 2021 | | Donatas Dabravolskas | Brazil | Royal Portuguese Cabinet of Reading, Rio de Janeiro |
| 2022 | | Kriengsak Jirasirirojanakorn | Thailand | A man cycling outside the wall of the Grand Palace, Bangkok |
| 2023 | | Mona Hassan Abo-Abda | Egypt | Giza Pyramids during "Forever is Now" exhibition, Giza |
| 2024 | | Donatas Dabravolskas | Brazil | Statue Christ the Redeemer over the clouds |
| 2025 | | Hossein pourakbarian | Iran | Dayir-e-Gachin caravanserai |

== Spin-offs ==
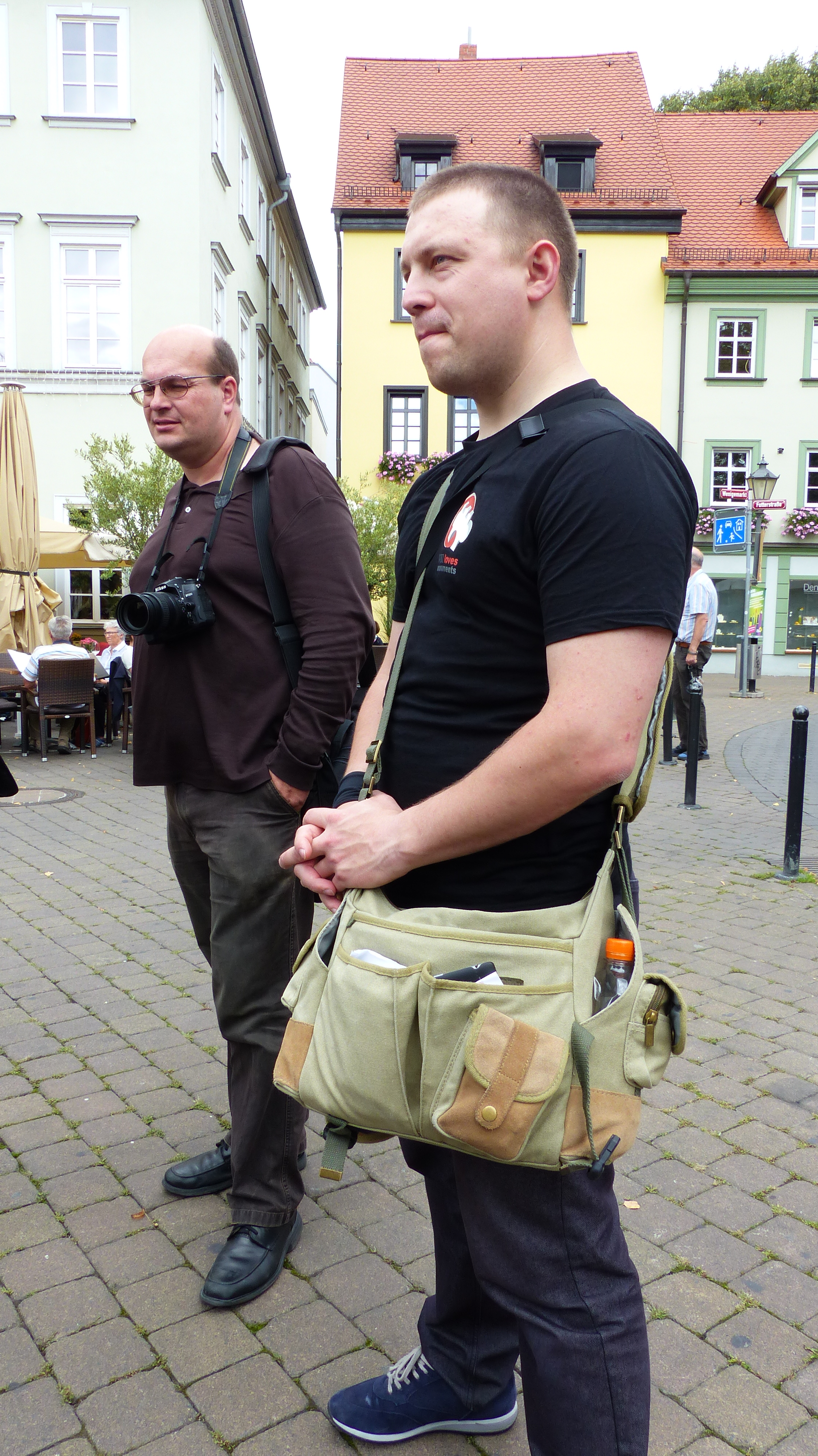
Wikipedians attending Wiki Loves Monuments in Erfurt

Wiki Loves Monuments Q&A during Wiki Indaba 2023 in Agadir, Morocco.

Several spin-offs based on Wiki Loves Monuments are organised within the Wikimedia movement locally and internationally. They generally follow the basics of Wiki Loves Monuments and mostly differentiate in their scope and changes in some of the rules.

- In spring 2013, a photographic competition called Wiki Loves Earth (Ukrainian: Вікі любить Землю) was organised in Ukraine with a main focus on taking photographs of the natural heritage sites in Ukraine and subsequently uploading them on Wikimedia Commons.
- A few months later, Wikimedia Sweden and Europeana initiated a photographic competition with the name Wiki Loves Public Art aiming to increase the number of photographs taken from public artworks. The project was organised in five countries and resulted in more than 9,250 photographs uploaded.
- In autumn 2013, the photographic competition Wiki Loves Cultural Heritage (Macedonian: Вики го сака културното наследство) was organised in North Macedonia, broadening the scope of Wiki Loves Monuments to include cultural heritage in any form, both tangible and intangible, including monuments, heritage sites, dishes, outfit, tapestries, crafts, dances and other elements of traditional culture.

== See also ==
- Wiki Loves Monuments on Wikimedia Commons
- Wiki Loves Monuments 2010 winners
- Wiki Loves Monuments 2011 winners
- Wiki Loves Monuments 2012 winners
- Wiki Loves Monuments 2013 winners
- Wiki Loves Monuments 2014 winners
- Wiki Loves Monuments 2015 winners
- Wiki Loves Monuments 2016 winners
- Wiki Loves Monuments 2017 winners
- Wiki Loves Monuments 2018 winners
- Wiki Loves Monuments 2019 winners
- Wiki Loves Monuments 2020 winners
- Wiki Loves Monuments 2021 winners
- Wiki Loves Monuments 2022 winners
- Wiki Loves Monuments 2023 winners
- Wiki Loves Monuments 2024 winners
- Wiki Loves Monuments 2025 winners
