= Johan Kvarnström =

Finnish politician

Member of the Finnish Parliament for Uusimaa

Personal details
- Born: Johan Birger Matias Kvarnström; 27 March 1986 (age 40) Ekenäs, Finland
- Party: Social Democratic Party of Finland
- Education: Åbo Akademi University

Johan Birger Matias Kvarnström (born 27 March 1986) is a Finland-Swedish politician currently serving in the Parliament of Finland for the Social Democratic Party of Finland at the Uusimaa constituency.
