= Ilhéu de Cima (Porto Santo) =

Island of Madeira, Portugal

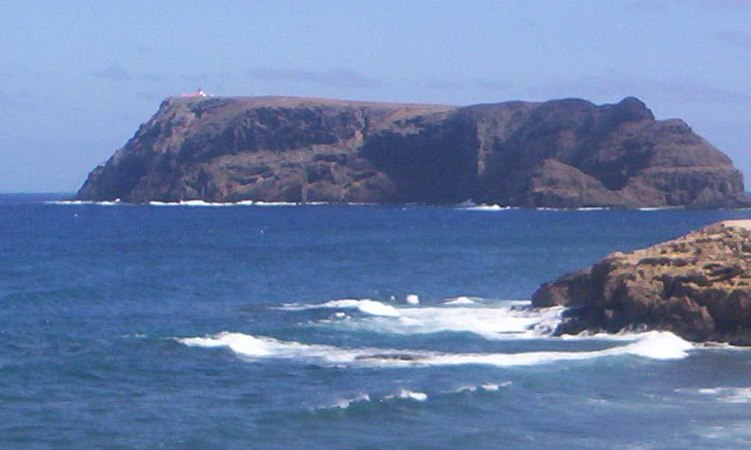
- Ilhéu de Cima, with the lighthouse on the left

- Location of the islet inside the Municipality of Porto Santo

Geography
- Location: Atlantic Ocean
- Coordinates: 33.054°N 16.282°W
- Area: 0.30 km^{2} (0.12 sq mi)
- Highest elevation: 121 m (397 ft)

Administration
- Portugal
- Autonomous Region: Madeira
- Municipality: Porto Santo
- Freguesia: Porto Santo

Demographics
- Population: 0

Ilhéu de Cima is a small island about 400 meters off the east coast of Porto Santo Island, Madeira, Portugal. Its area is 30.07 ha (74.3 acres). The islet is 121 meters high, bare and nearly flat, with steep cliffs towards the sea. It is the easternmost point of the Madeira archipelago. It is part of the Network of Marine Protected Areas of Porto Santo (RAMPPS), which covers the six islets around Porto Santo and the marine areas surrounding them. There is a lighthouse on the northeastern part of the island. It is a 15 m high masonry tower, with focal height 124 m. It went into operation in 1901.

== Nature ==
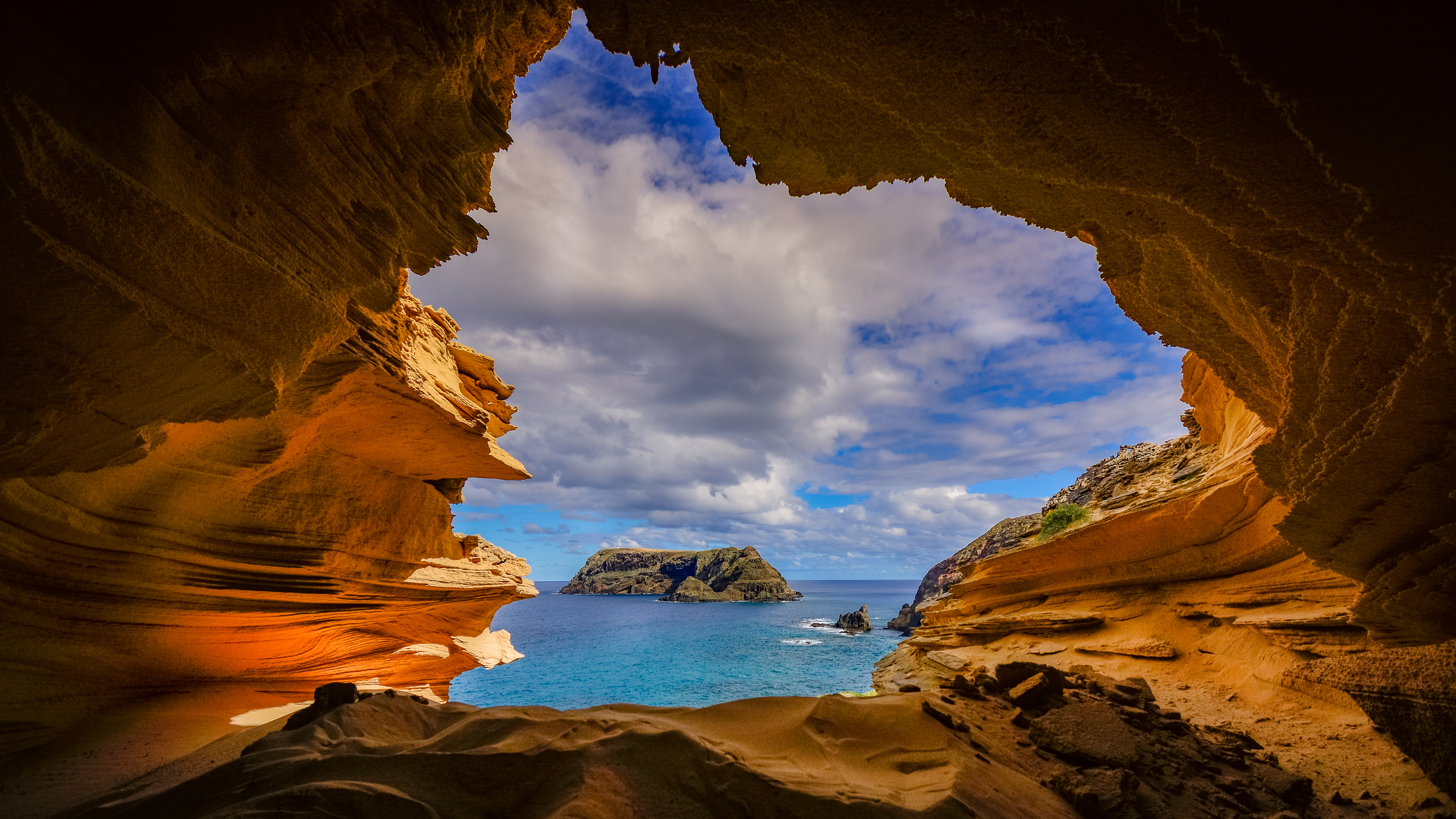
Ilhéu de Cima seen from a sand rock formation

The island is home to several endemic species of land snails, including Lampadia webbiana, Amphorella cimensis, and Hystricella turricula, which only occurs on Ilhéu de Cima.
