= Vijzelstraat 31 =

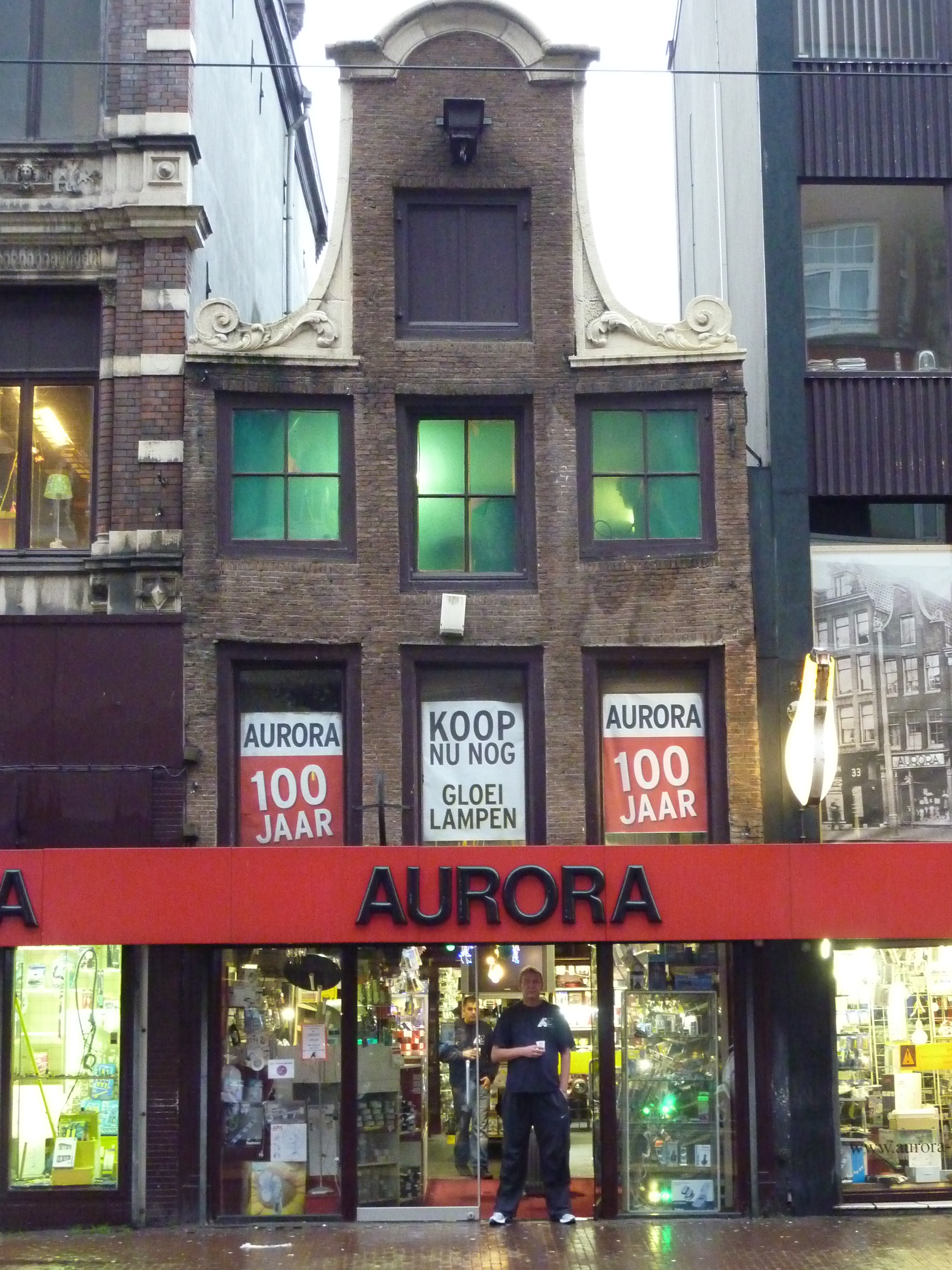
- Vijzelstraat 31, Amsterdam (2010)
- Interactive map of the Vijzelstraat 31 area

General information
- Location: Vijzelstraat 31, Amsterdam, Netherlands
- Coordinates: 52°21′58.53″N 4°53′36.01″E
- Construction started: 17th century

Vijzelstraat 31 in Amsterdam, The Netherlands, is a historical establishment, probably dating from the 17th century. It has a gable roof from the first half of the 18th century. The building is currently used as a shop, together with the adjacent buildings (numbers 27 to 35) by Aurora, a supplier of electrical and electronic products. The building has the status of "Rijksmonument" (national monument).
