= Ann-Sophie Qvarnström =

Swedish illustrator and silversmith (born 1958)

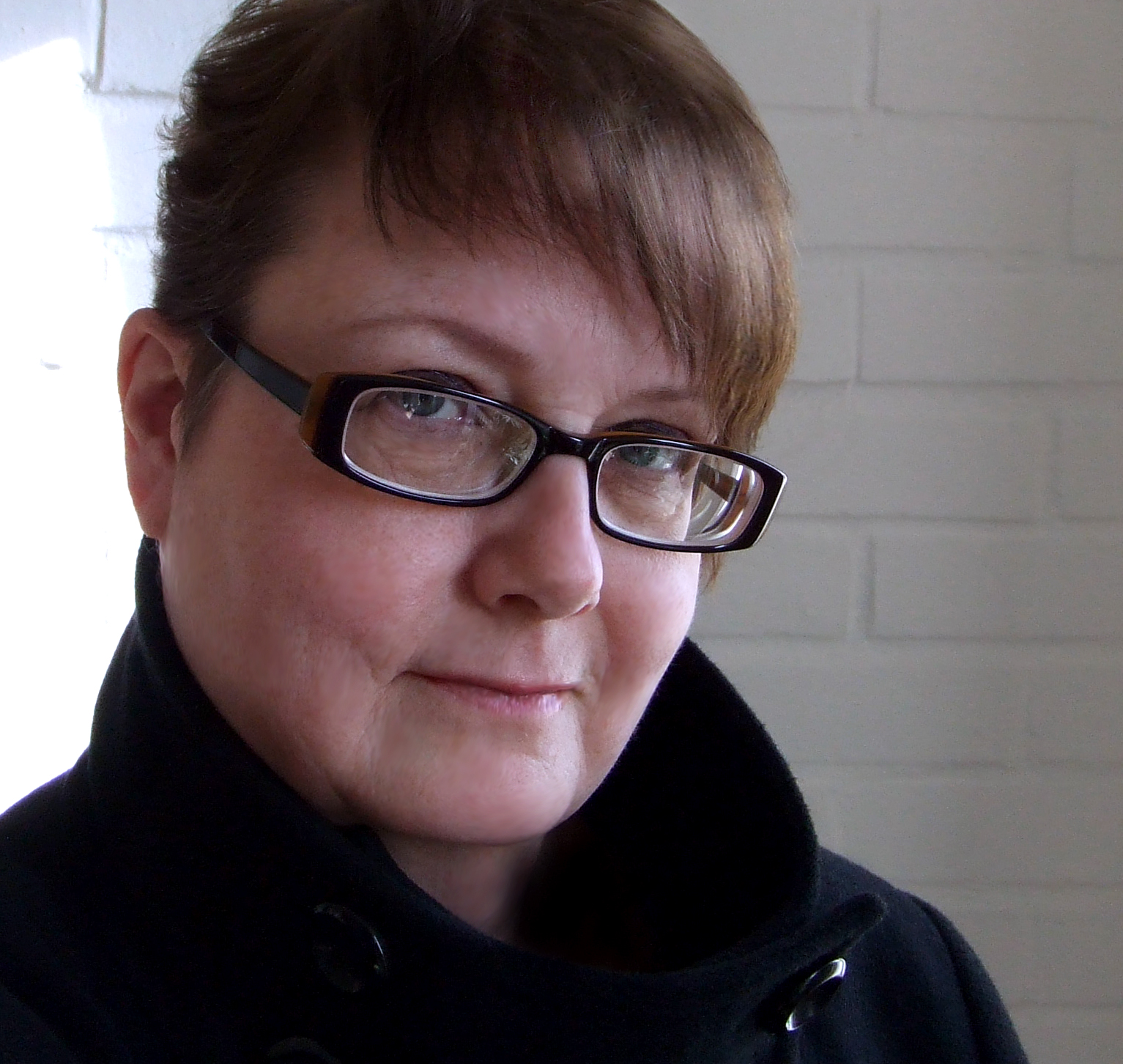
- Born: Ann-Sophie Linnéa Qvarnström; 26 July 1958 (age 68)
- Education: Royal Institute of Technology, Stockholm
- Known for: Illustration; Silversmith

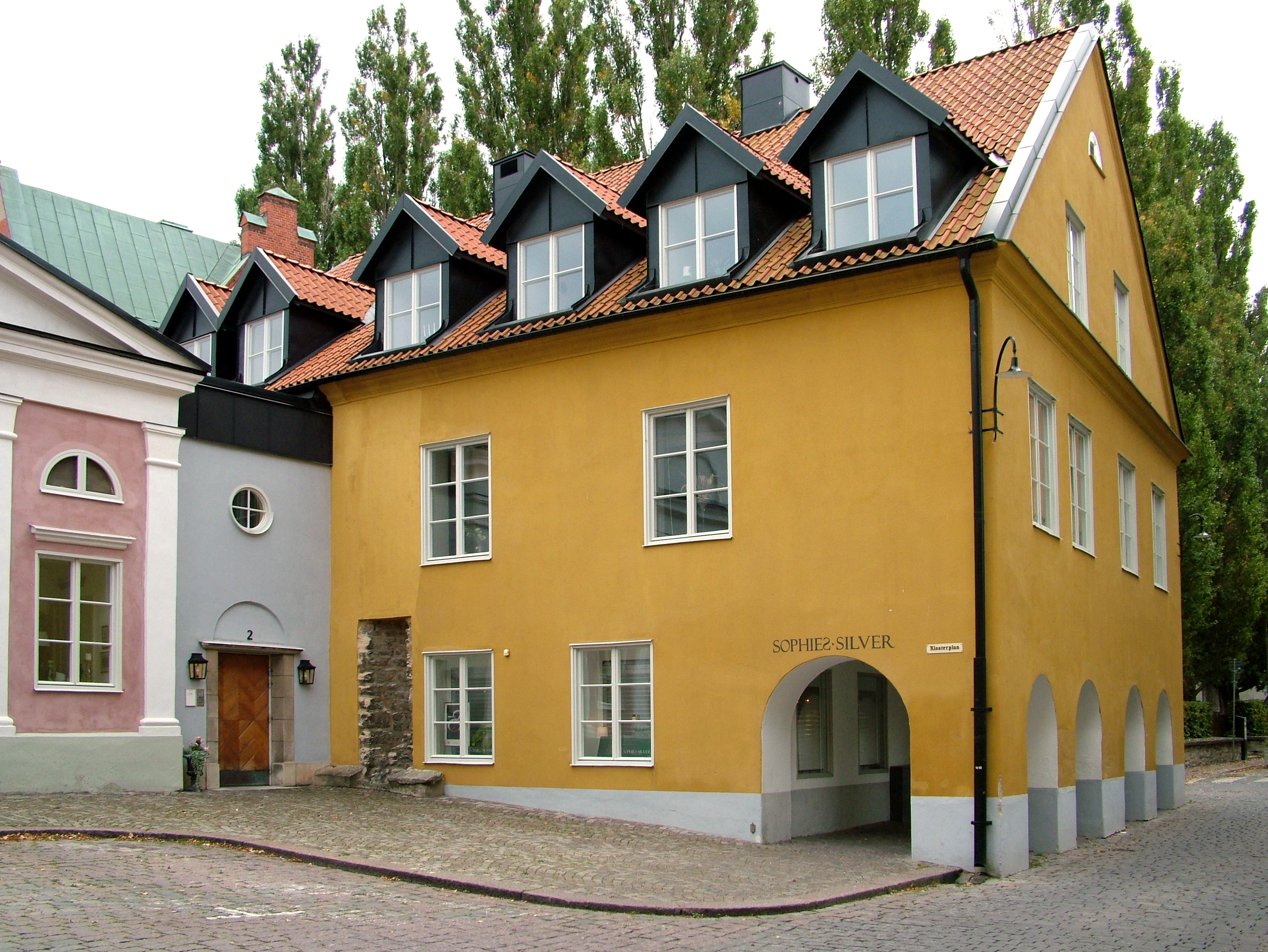
Sophies Silver at Sankt Hansgatan 34, Visby.

Ann-Sophie Qvarnström (born 26 July 1958) is a Swedish illustrator and silversmith best known for the maps she made for the Swedish role-playing ("RPG") community during the 1980s.

== Biography ==
In 1984 she established the company Sophias Ateljé and opened a shop in Stockholm. About this time she came to the attentions of Äventyrsspel and Iron Crown Enterprises and during the following years she made many illustrated maps for their board games and role-playing games. In 1986 she made one of the first Swedish RPG maps in colour, the same year she co-wrote the town module Kandra together with her husband. After that she drew maps for many of the games by Äventyrsspel.

In 1993 she and her company moved to Visby, and she began to focus on jewellery design but she still did some props, patterns and garb for the Medieval Week on Gotland. In 2013 she was one of the winners in the Wiki Loves Monuments competition.
