= Gülper See =

Lake in Brandenburg, Germany

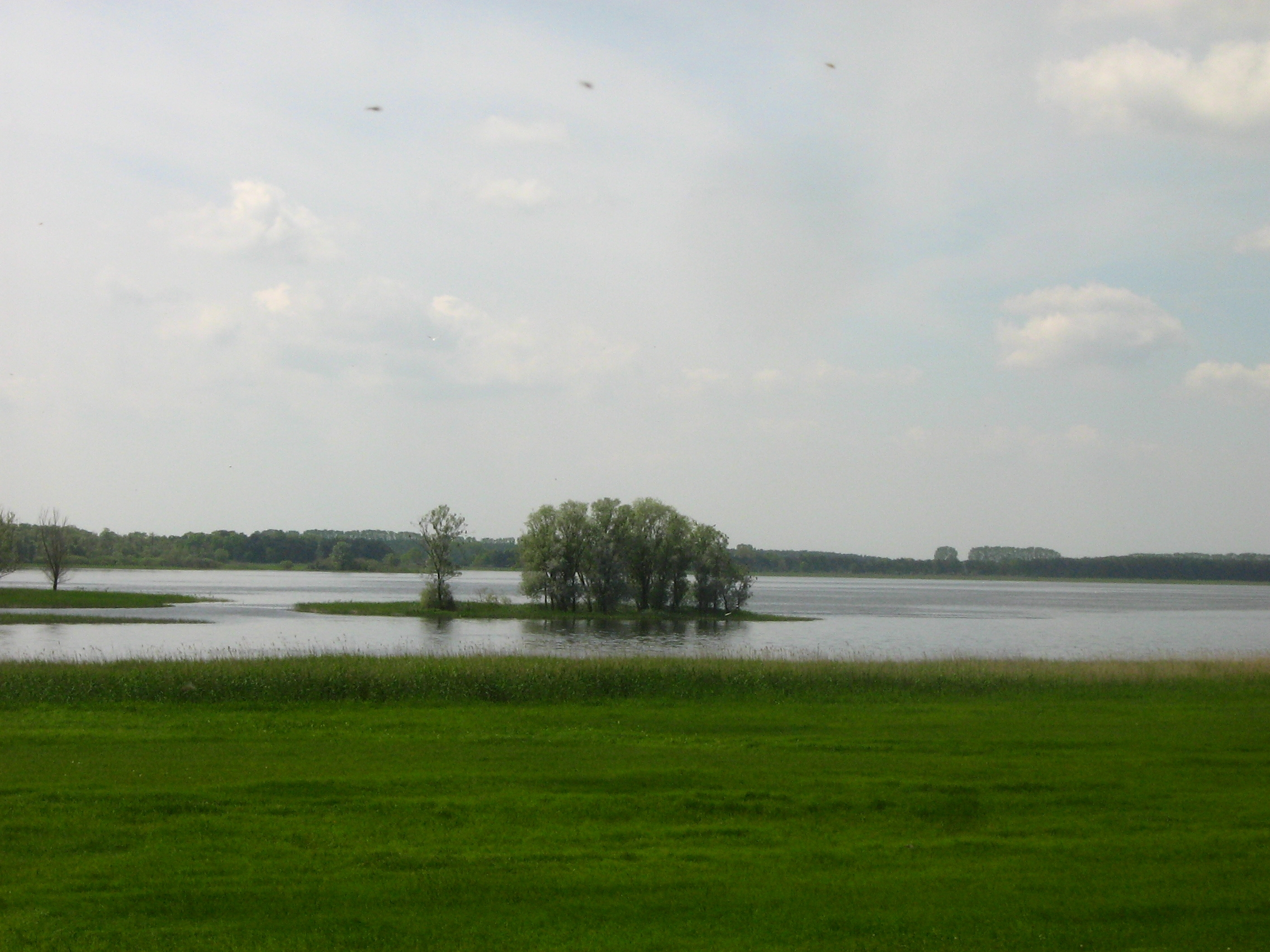

- Location within Brandenburg
- Location: Brandenburg
- Coordinates: 52°44′22″N 12°15′16″E
- Primary inflows: Rhin
- Primary outflows: Rhin
- Basin countries: Germany
- Surface area: 6.6 km^{2} (2.5 sq mi)
- Average depth: 1.5 m (4 ft 11 in)
- Max. depth: 3 m (9.8 ft)
- Surface elevation: 23.6 m (77 ft)

Ramsar Wetland
- Official name: Niederung der Unteren Havel/Gülper See/Schollener See
- Designated: 31 July 1978
- Reference no.: 173

Gülper See is a lake in Brandenburg, Germany. At an elevation of 23.6 m, its surface area is 6.6 km². It is located in the municipality of Havelaue, Havelland district. Since 1978 the lake has been included in a protected Ramsar site.
