= List of Palpimanidae species =

This page lists all described species of the spider family Palpimanidae accepted by the World Spider Catalog as of February 2021:

== A ==
=== Anisaedus ===
Anisaedus Simon, 1893

- A. aethiopicus Tullgren, 1910 — Tanzania
- A. gaujoni Simon, 1893 (type) — Ecuador, Peru
- A. levii Chickering, 1966 — Africa
- A. pellucidas Platnick, 1975 — Chile
- A. rufus (Tullgren, 1905) — Argentina
- A. stridulans González, 1956 — Peru

== B ==
=== Badia ===
Badia Roewer, 1961

- B. rugosa Roewer, 1961 (type) — Senegal

=== Boagrius ===
Boagrius

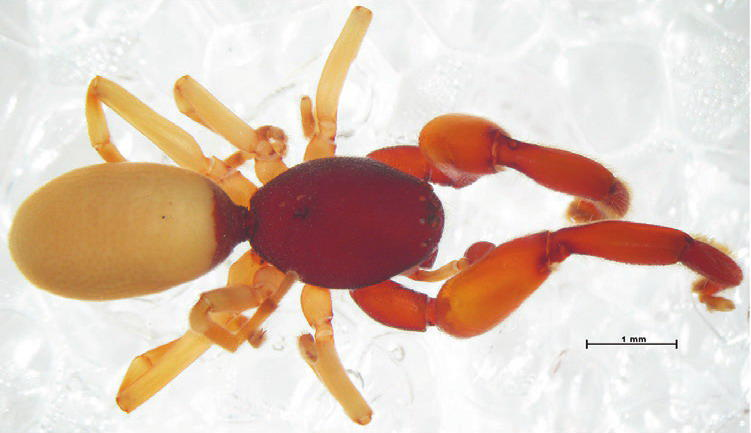
Boagrius sp.

Boagrius Simon, 1893

- B. pumilus Simon, 1893 (type) — Malaysia (Peninsula), Singapore, Indonesia (Sumatra)
- B. simoni Zonstein & Marusik, 2020 — Malaysia (Borneo)

== C ==
=== Chedima ===
Chedima Simon, 1873

- C. purpurea Simon, 1873 (type) — Morocco

=== Chedimanops ===
Chedimanops Zonstein & Marusik, 2017

- C. eskovi Zonstein & Marusik, 2017 (type) — Congo
- C. rwenzorensis Zonstein & Marusik, 2017 — Congo

== D ==
=== Diaphorocellus ===
Diaphorocellus Simon, 1893

- D. albooculatus Lawrence, 1927 — Namibia
- D. biplagiatus Simon, 1893 (type) — South Africa
- D. helveolus (Simon, 1910) — Botswana
- D. isalo Zonstein & Marusik, 2020 — Madagascar
- D. jocquei Zonstein & Marusik, 2020 — Madagascar
- D. rufus (Tullgren, 1910) — Tanzania

== F ==
=== Fernandezina ===
Fernandezina Birabén, 1951

- F. acuta Platnick, 1975 — Brazil
- F. andersoni Cala-Riquelme & Agnarsson, 2018 — Colombia
- F. dasilvai Platnick, Grismado & Ramírez, 1999 — Brazil
- F. divisa Platnick, 1975 — Brazil
- F. eduardoi Cala-Riquelme, Quijano-Cuervo & Sabogal-Gonzáles, 2018 — Colombia
- F. ilheus Platnick, Grismado & Ramírez, 1999 — Brazil
- F. jurubatiba Castro, Baptista, Grismado & Ramírez, 2015 — Brazil
- F. maldonado Platnick, Grismado & Ramírez, 1999 — Peru
- F. nica Ott & Ott, 2014 — Brazil
- F. pelta Platnick, 1975 — Brazil
- F. pulchra Birabén, 1951 (type) — Brazil, Bolivia, Argentina
- F. saira Buckup & Ott, 2004 — Brazil
- F. takutu Grismado, 2002 — Guyana
- F. tijuca Ramírez & Grismado, 1996 — Brazil

== H ==
=== Hybosida ===
Hybosida Simon, 1898

- H. dauban Platnick, 1979 — Seychelles
- H. lesserti Berland, 1920 — East Africa
- H. lucida Simon, 1898 (type) — Seychelles
- H. machondogo Oketch & Li, 2020 — Kenya
- H. scabra Simon & Fage, 1922 — East Africa

=== Hybosidella ===
Hybosidella Zonstein & Marusik, 2017

- H. etinde Zonstein & Marusik, 2017 (type) — Cameroon

== I ==
=== Ikuma ===
Ikuma Lawrence, 1938

- I. spiculosa (Lawrence, 1927) (type) — Namibia
- I. squamata Lawrence, 1938 — Namibia

== L ==
=== Levymanus ===
Levymanus

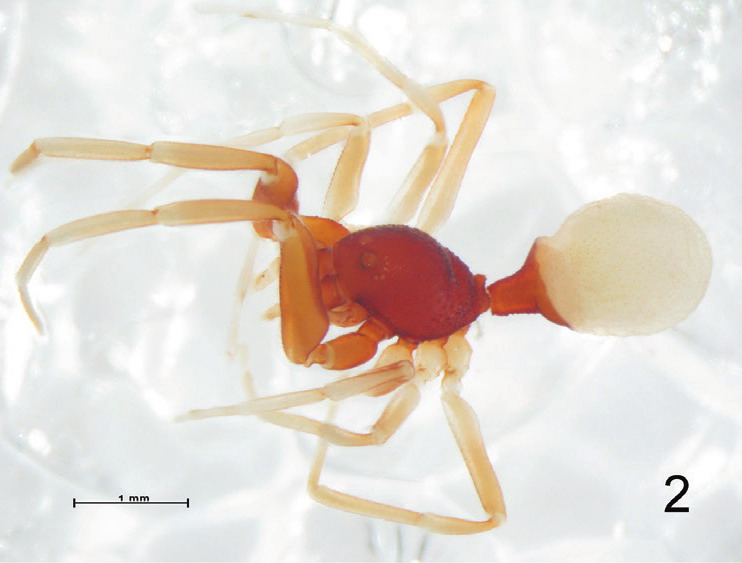
Levymanus gershomi, female

Levymanus Zonstein & Marusik, 2013

- L. dezfulensis Zamani & Marusik, 2020 — Iran
- L. gershomi Zonstein & Marusik, 2013 (type) — Israel, Saudi Arabia, United Arab Emirates
- L. ras Zonstein, Marusik & Kovblyuk, 2017 — Ethiopia

== N ==
=== Notiothops ===
Notiothops Platnick, Grismado & Ramírez, 1999

- N. birabeni (Zapfe, 1961) — Chile
- N. campana Platnick, Grismado & Ramírez, 1999 — Chile
- N. cekalovici Platnick, Grismado & Ramírez, 1999 — Chile
- N. huaquen Platnick, Grismado & Ramírez, 1999 — Chile
- N. llolleo Platnick, Grismado & Ramírez, 1999 — Chile
- N. maulensis (Platnick, 1985) — Chile
- N. noxiosus Platnick, Grismado & Ramírez, 1999 (type) — Chile
- N. penai Platnick, Grismado & Ramírez, 1999 — Chile

== O ==
=== Otiothops ===
Otiothops MacLeay, 1839

- O. alayoni Cala-Riquelme & Agnarsson, 2014 — Cuba
- O. amazonicus Simon, 1887 — Colombia, Brazil
- O. atalaia Castro, Baptista, Grismado & Ramírez, 2015 — Brazil
- O. atlanticus Platnick, Grismado & Ramírez, 1999 — Brazil
- O. baculus Platnick, 1975 — Brazil
- O. besotes Cala-Riquelme & Agnarsson, 2018 — Colombia
- O. birabeni Mello-Leitão, 1945 — Brazil, Argentina
- O. brevis Simon, 1893 — Venezuela
- O. calcaratus Mello-Leitão, 1927 — Colombia
- O. chicaque Cala-Riquelme, Quijano-Cuervo & Agnarsson, 2018 — Colombia
- O. clavus Platnick, 1975 — Brazil
- O. contus Platnick, 1975 — Brazil
- O. curua Brescovit, Bonaldo & Barreiros, 2007 — Brazil
- O. doctorstrange Cala-Riquelme & Quijano-Cuervo, 2018 — Colombia
- O. dubius Mello-Leitão, 1927 — Brazil
- O. facis Platnick, 1975 — Brazil
- O. franzi Wunderlich, 1999 — Venezuela
- O. fulvus (Mello-Leitão, 1932) — Brazil
- O. germaini Simon, 1927 — Brazil
- O. giralunas Grismado, 2002 — Guyana
- O. goloboffi Grismado, 1996 — Argentina
- O. gounellei Simon, 1887 — Brazil
- O. goytacaz Castro, Baptista, Grismado & Ramírez, 2015 — Brazil
- O. helena Brescovit & Bonaldo, 1993 — Brazil
- O. hoeferi Brescovit & Bonaldo, 1993 — Brazil
- O. iguazu Grismado, 2008 — Argentina
- O. inflatus Platnick, 1975 — Paraguay, Argentina
- O. intortus Platnick, 1975 — Trinidad
- O. kathiae Piacentini, Ávila, Pérez & Grismado, 2013 — Bolivia
- O. kochalkai Platnick, 1978 — Colombia
- O. lajeado Buckup & Ott, 2004 — Brazil
- O. loris Platnick, 1975 — Peru
- O. luteus (Keyserling, 1891) — Brazil
- O. macleayi Banks, 1929 — Panama, Colombia
- O. namratae Pillai, 2006 — India
- O. naokii Piacentini, Ávila, Pérez & Grismado, 2013 — Bolivia
- O. oblongus Simon, 1892 — St. Vincent, Trinidad, Venezuela, Guyana, Brazil
- O. payak Grismado & Ramírez, 2002 — Argentina
- O. pentucus Chickering, 1967 — Virgin Is.
- O. pilleus Platnick, 1975 — Brazil
- O. platnicki Wunderlich, 1999 — Brazil
- O. puraquequara Brescovit, Bonaldo & Barreiros, 2007 — Brazil
- O. recurvus Platnick, 1976 — Brazil
- O. setosus Mello-Leitão, 1927 — Brazil
- O. typicus (Mello-Leitão, 1927) — Brazil
- O. vaupes Cala-Riquelme, Quijano-Cuervo & Agnarsson, 2018 — Colombia
- O. walckenaeri MacLeay, 1839 (type) — Bahama Is., Cuba
- O. whitticki Mello-Leitão, 1940 — Guyana

== P ==
=== Palpimanus ===
Palpimanus Dufour, 1820

- P. aegyptiacus Kulczyński, 1909 — Algeria, Tunisia, Egypt, Chad
- P. argentinus Mello-Leitão, 1927 — Argentina
- P. armatus Pocock, 1898 — South Africa
- P. aureus Lawrence, 1927 — Namibia
- P. canariensis Kulczyński, 1909 — Canary Is.
- P. capensis Simon, 1893 — South Africa
- P. crudeni Lessert, 1936 — Mozambique
- P. cyprius Kulczyński, 1909 — Cyprus, Syria, Israel
- P. denticulatus Hernández-Corral & Ferrández, 2017 — Morocco
- P. gibbulus Dufour, 1820 (type) — Mediterranean, Central Asia, Iran?
- P. giltayi Lessert, 1936 — Mozambique
- P. globulifer Simon, 1893 — South Africa
- P. hesperius Simon, 1907 — São Tomé and Príncipe
- P. leppanae Pocock, 1902 — South Africa
- P. lualabanus Benoit, 1974 — Congo
- P. maroccanus Kulczyński, 1909 — Morocco, Algeria
- P. meruensis Tullgren, 1910 — Tanzania
- P. namaquensis Simon, 1910 — Namibia, South Africa
- P. nubilus Simon, 1910 — Namibia
- P. orientalis Kulczyński, 1909 — Albania, Greece, Turkey
- P. paroculus Simon, 1910 — Namibia, South Africa
- P. potteri Lawrence, 1937 — South Africa
- P. processiger Strand, 1913 — Rwanda
- P. pseudarmatus Lawrence, 1952 — South Africa
- P. punctatus Kritscher, 1996 — Malta
- P. schmitzi Kulczyński, 1909 — Syria, Israel
- P. simoni Kulczyński, 1909 — Syria, Lebanon, Israel
- P. sogdianus Charitonov, 1946 — Turkey, Iran, Central Asia
- P. stridulator Lawrence, 1962 — Namibia
- P. subarmatus Lawrence, 1947 — South Africa
- P. transvaalicus Simon, 1893 — South Africa
- P. tuberculatus Lawrence, 1952 — South Africa
- P. uncatus Kulczyński, 1909 — Greece, Turkey, Egypt
- P. vultuosus Simon, 1897 — India
- P. wagneri Charitonov, 1946 — Uzbekistan

== S ==
=== Sarascelis ===
Sarascelis

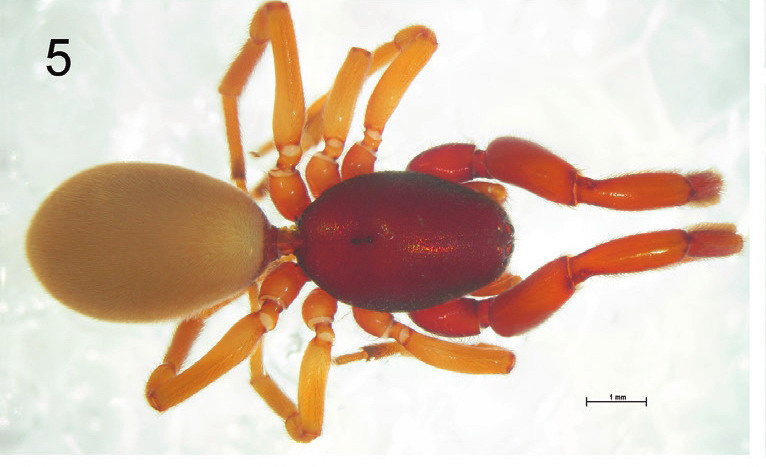
Sarascelis chaperi, female

Sarascelis Simon, 1887

- S. chaperi Simon, 1887 (type) — Ivory Coast, Guinea-Bissau
- S. junquai Jézéquel, 1964 — Ivory Coast
- S. kilimandjari (Berland, 1920) — Tanzania
- S. lamtoensis Jézéquel, 1964 — Ivory Coast, Ghana
- S. luteipes Simon, 1887 — Congo, São Tomé and Príncipe
- S. raffrayi Simon, 1893 — Singapore, India?
- S. rebiereae Jézéquel, 1964 — Ivory Coast

=== Scelidocteus ===
Scelidocteus

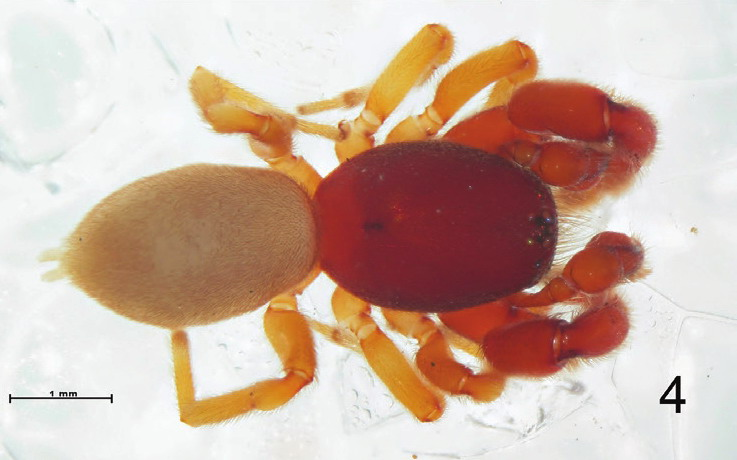
Scelidocteus sp.

Scelidocteus Simon, 1907

- S. baccatus Simon, 1907 — São Tomé and Príncipe
- S. berlandi Lessert, 1930 — Congo
- S. incisus (Tullgren, 1910) — Tanzania
- S. lamottei Jézéquel, 1964 — Ivory Coast
- S. ochreatus Simon, 1907 — Guinea-Bissau
- S. pachypus Simon, 1907 (type) — West Africa
- S. schoutedeni Benoit, 1974 — Congo
- S. taitave Oketch & Li, 2020 — Kenya
- S. vuattouxi Jézéquel, 1964 — Ivory Coast

=== Scelidomachus ===
Scelidomachus

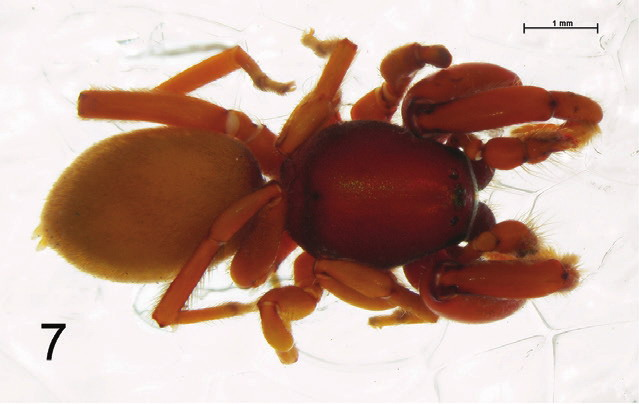
Scelidomachus socotranus, male

Scelidomachus Pocock, 1899

- S. socotranus Pocock, 1899 (type) — Yemen (Socotra)

=== Sceliscelis ===
Sceliscelis Oketch & Li, 2020

- S. marshi Oketch & Li, 2020 (type) — Kenya

=== Steriphopus ===
Steriphopus

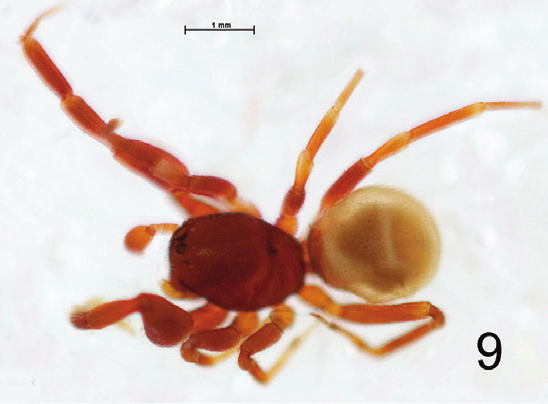
Steriphopus macleayi, male

Steriphopus Simon, 1887

- S. crassipalpis Thorell, 1895 — Myanmar
- S. lacertosus Simon, 1898 — Seychelles
- S. macleayi (O. Pickard-Cambridge, 1873) (type) — Sri Lanka

== T ==
=== Tibetima ===
Tibetima Lin & Li, 2020

- T. char Lin & Li, 2020 (type) — China
- T. gyirongensis (Hu & Li, 1987) — China
