= Palpimanus godawan =

Scientific classification
- Domain: Eukaryota
- Kingdom: Animalia
- Phylum: Arthropoda
- Subphylum: Chelicerata
- Class: Arachnida
- Order: Araneae
- Infraorder: Araneomorphae
- Family: Palpimanidae
- Genus: Palpimanus
- Species: P. godawan

Binomial name
- Palpimanus godawan Tripathi & Sankaran, 2023

Species of spider

Palpimanus godawan is a spider species of the family Palpimanidae that is endemic to Rajasthan, India. It was first discovered in 2023 by Tripathi et al. The specific epithet ‘Godawan’ is the vernacular name of the great Indian bustard which is state bird of Rajasthan. It is found under rocks or occasionally under cattle dung.
