= Palpimanus maldhok =

Scientific classification
- Domain: Eukaryota
- Kingdom: Animalia
- Phylum: Arthropoda
- Subphylum: Chelicerata
- Class: Arachnida
- Order: Araneae
- Infraorder: Araneomorphae
- Family: Palpimanidae
- Genus: Palpimanus
- Species: P. maldhok

Binomial name
- Palpimanus maldhok Kuni, Thripathi & Sankaran, 2023

Species of spider

Palpimanus maldhok is a spider species of the family Palpimanidae that is endemic to India. It was first discovered in 2023 by Tripathi et al. The specific epithet 'maldhok' is the vernacular name of the great Indian bustard (Ardeotis nigriceps) in Maharashtra, an Indian State. It is reported from Solapur, Maharashtra only and also found under rocks and moves slowly.
