= Ikuma (spider) =

Scientific classification
- Kingdom: Animalia
- Phylum: Arthropoda
- Subphylum: Chelicerata
- Class: Arachnida
- Order: Araneae
- Infraorder: Araneomorphae
- Family: Palpimanidae
- Genus: Ikuma; Lawrence, 1938

Type species
- I. spiculosa (Lawrence, 1927)

Species
- I. spiculosa (Lawrence, 1927) – Namibia; I. squamata Lawrence, 1938 – Namibia

Genus of spiders

Ikuma is a genus of Namibian palp-footed spiders that was first described by R. F. Lawrence in 1938. As of June 2019, it contains only two species, found only in Namibia: I. spiculosa and I. squamata.
