= Palpimanus subarmatus =

Scientific classification
- Kingdom: Animalia
- Phylum: Arthropoda
- Subphylum: Chelicerata
- Class: Arachnida
- Order: Araneae
- Infraorder: Araneomorphae
- Family: Palpimanidae
- Genus: Palpimanus
- Species: P. subarmatus

Binomial name
- Palpimanus subarmatus Lawrence, 1947

Species of spider

Palpimanus subarmatus is a species of spider in the family Palpimanidae. It is endemic to South Africa.

== Distribution ==
Palpimanus subarmatus is known from two provinces in South Africa, KwaZulu-Natal and Limpopo.

== Habitat and ecology ==
The species is a free-living ground dweller, collected from pitfall traps from the Savanna biome at 140 m above sea level.

== Description ==
The species is known only from the male. Colour carapace deep reddish, leg I reddish, remaining legs and pedipalps orange. Carapace with cephalic part strongly raised, its upper surface horizontal, descending almost vertically posteriorly to the thoracic striae.

Posterior eye row straight to slightly recurved, laterals a little larger than the medians which are 3-4 times their own diameter apart and 1½ times as far from the laterals as from each other; median quadrangle much longer than wide and a little narrower in front than behind.

Patella I along its upper surface considerably longer than tibia, considerably enlarged and triangular, its lower surface on the inner side with a sharp blackish keel ending distally in a blunt triangular point. Body size 8.7 mm.

== Conservation ==
Palpimanus subarmatus is listed as Data Deficient for taxonomic reasons. Too little is known about the location, habitat and threats of this taxon for an assessment to be made. Placement of the female is also problematic. There are no known threats to the species.

== Taxonomy ==
The species was originally described by Reginald Frederick Lawrence in 1947 from the type locality given only as Natal.
