= Palpimanus giltayi =

Mozambique Palp-Footed Spider

Conservation status
- Least Concern (SANBI Red List)

Scientific classification
- Kingdom: Animalia
- Phylum: Arthropoda
- Subphylum: Chelicerata
- Class: Arachnida
- Order: Araneae
- Infraorder: Araneomorphae
- Family: Palpimanidae
- Genus: Palpimanus
- Species: P. giltayi

Binomial name
- Palpimanus giltayi Lessert, 1936

Species of spider

Palpimanus giltayi is a species of spider in the family Palpimanidae. It occurs in Mozambique and South Africa and is commonly known as the Mozambique palp-footed spider.

== Distribution ==
Palpimanus giltayi is known from Mozambique and South Africa. In South Africa, the species is known only from KwaZulu-Natal.

== Habitat and ecology ==
The species is a free-running ground dweller. Little is known about their behaviour. It has been sampled from the Succulent Karoo biome at 635 m above sea level.

== Description ==
P. giltayi is known only from the male, with a body size of 9-10 mm. The carapace, sternum and the front legs are dark, with the rest of legs paler. The abdomen is dull red, covered with a grey hair layer.

== Conservation ==
Palpimanus giltayi is listed as Least Concern by the South African National Biodiversity Institute due to its wide southern African range. More sampling is needed to collect the female and determine the species' range, but threats to the species are unknown. It is protected in the Ndumo Game Reserve.

== Taxonomy ==
The species was originally described by Roger de Lessert in 1936 from Mozambique. It is known only from the male.
