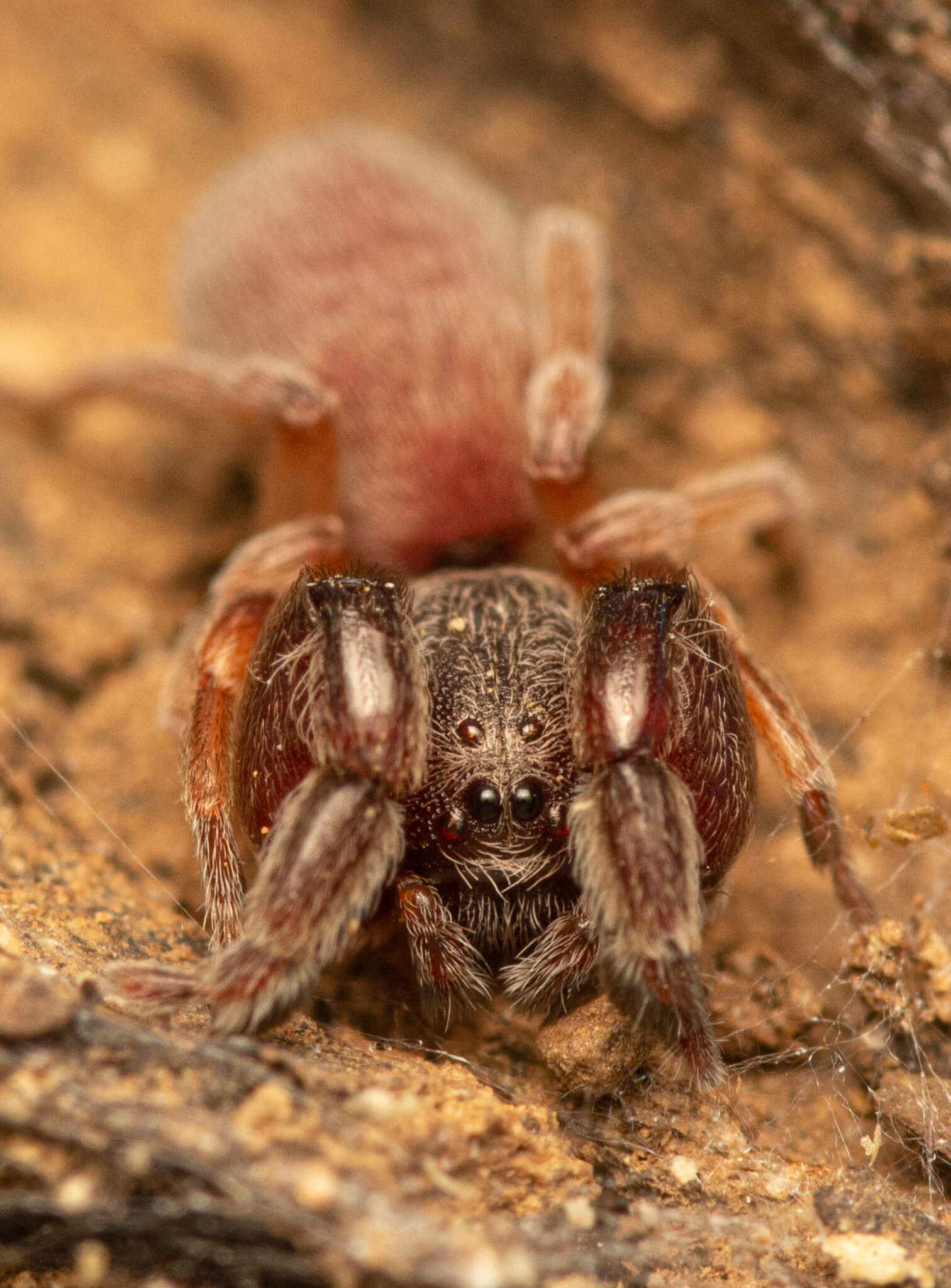
- female
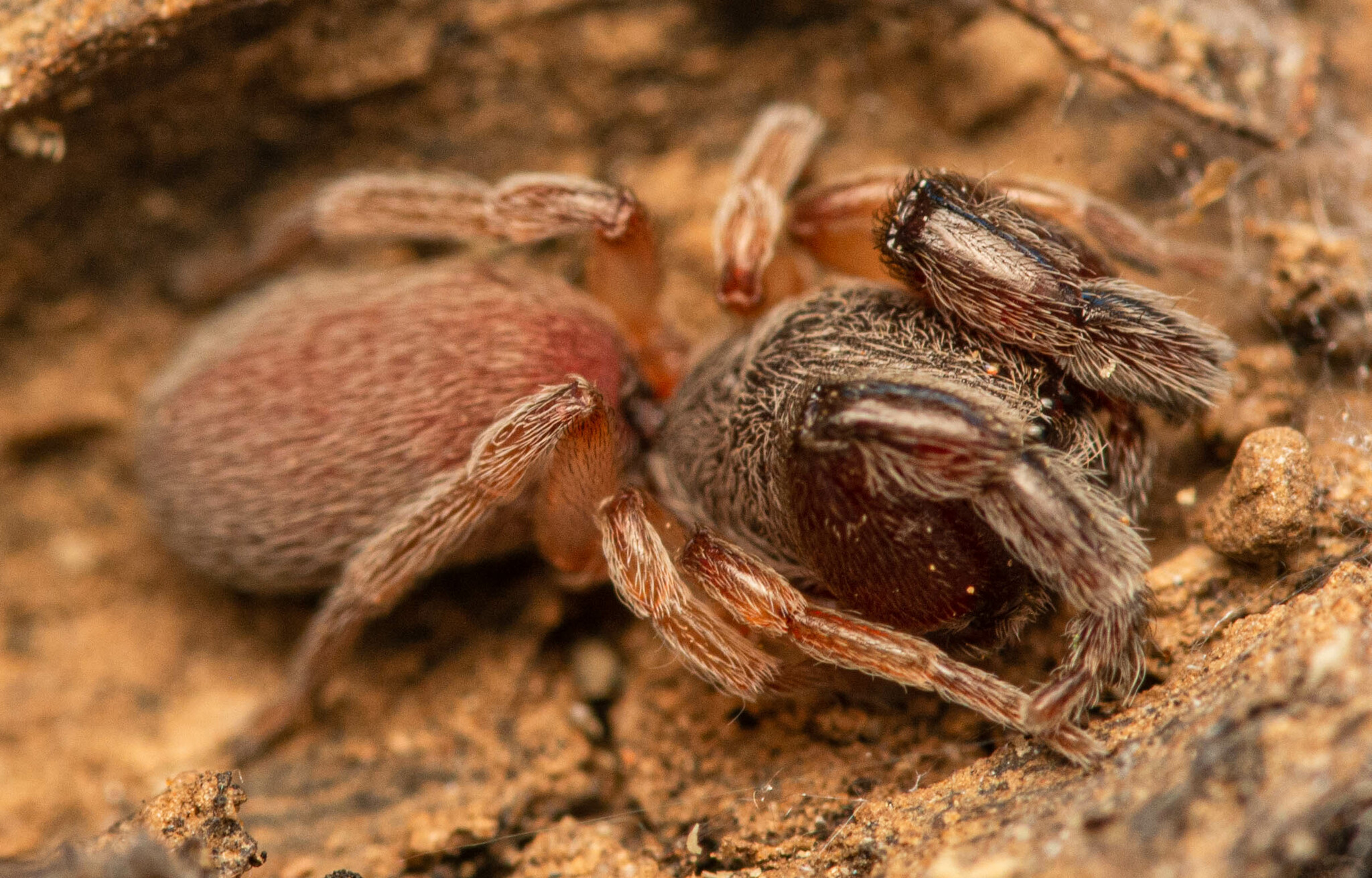
- female

Scientific classification
- Kingdom: Animalia
- Phylum: Arthropoda
- Subphylum: Chelicerata
- Class: Arachnida
- Order: Araneae
- Infraorder: Araneomorphae
- Family: Palpimanidae
- Genus: Palpimanus
- Species: P. potteri

Binomial name
- Palpimanus potteri Lawrence, 1937

= Palpimanus potteri =

Potter's Palp-Footed Spider

Species of spider

Palpimanus potteri is a species of spider in the family Palpimanidae. It is endemic to South Africa and is commonly known as Potter's palp-footed spider.

== Distribution ==
Palpimanus potteri is known from two provinces in South Africa: KwaZulu-Natal and Limpopo.

== Habitat and ecology ==
The species is a free-living ground dweller, some specimens have been found in rocky areas. It has been sampled from the Savanna biome at altitudes ranging from 31 to 1119 m above sea level.

== Description ==
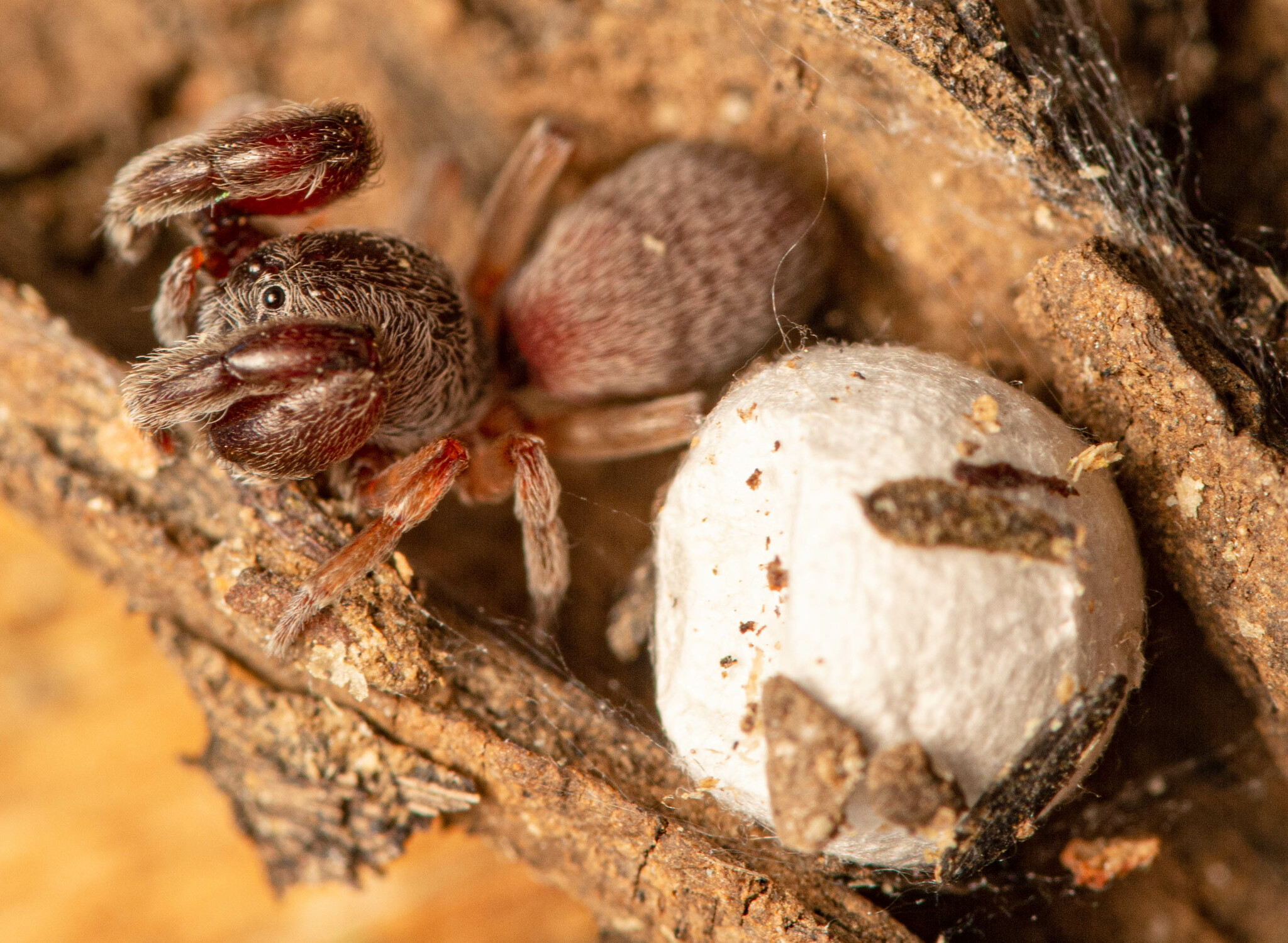
female

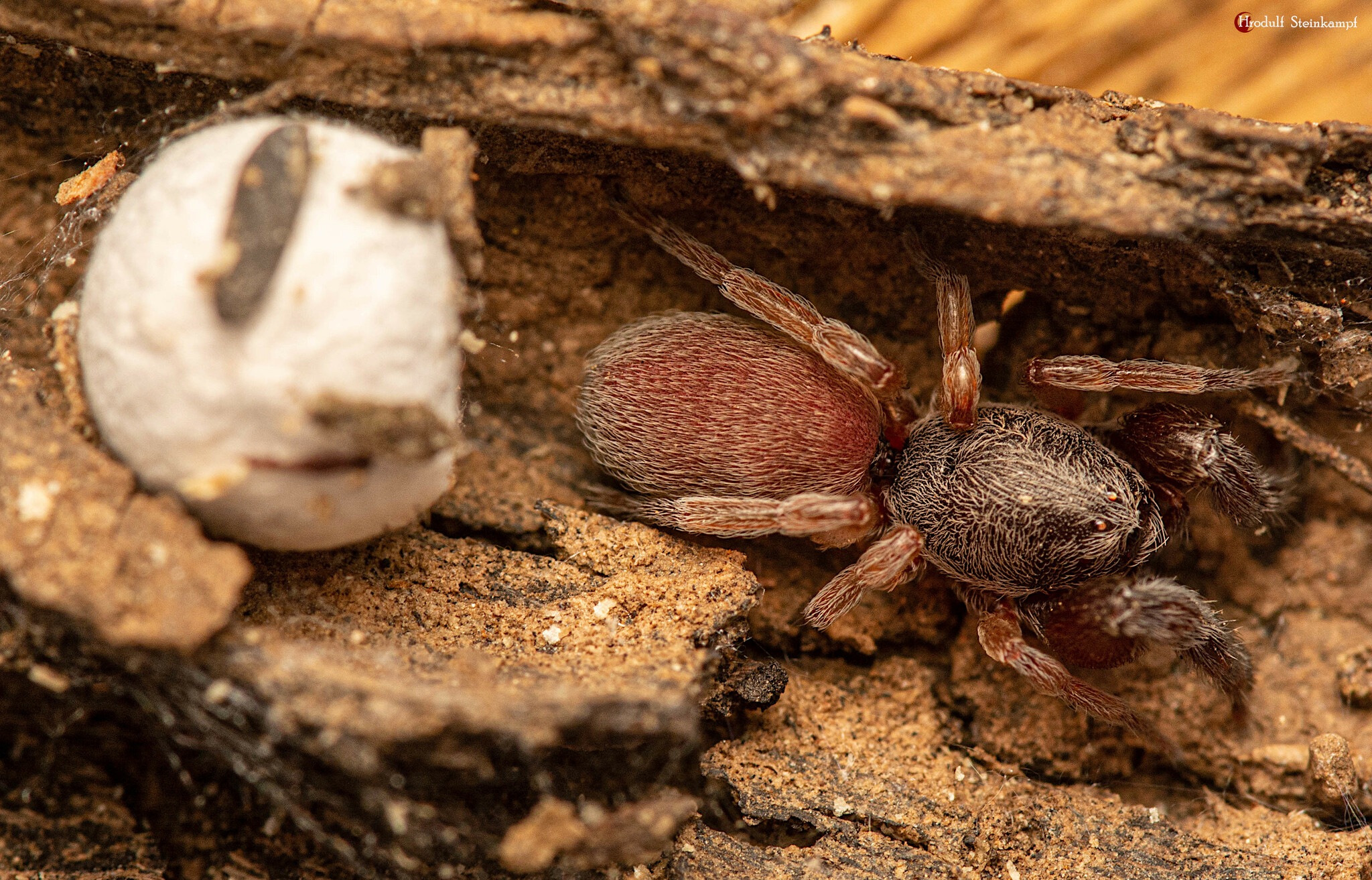
female

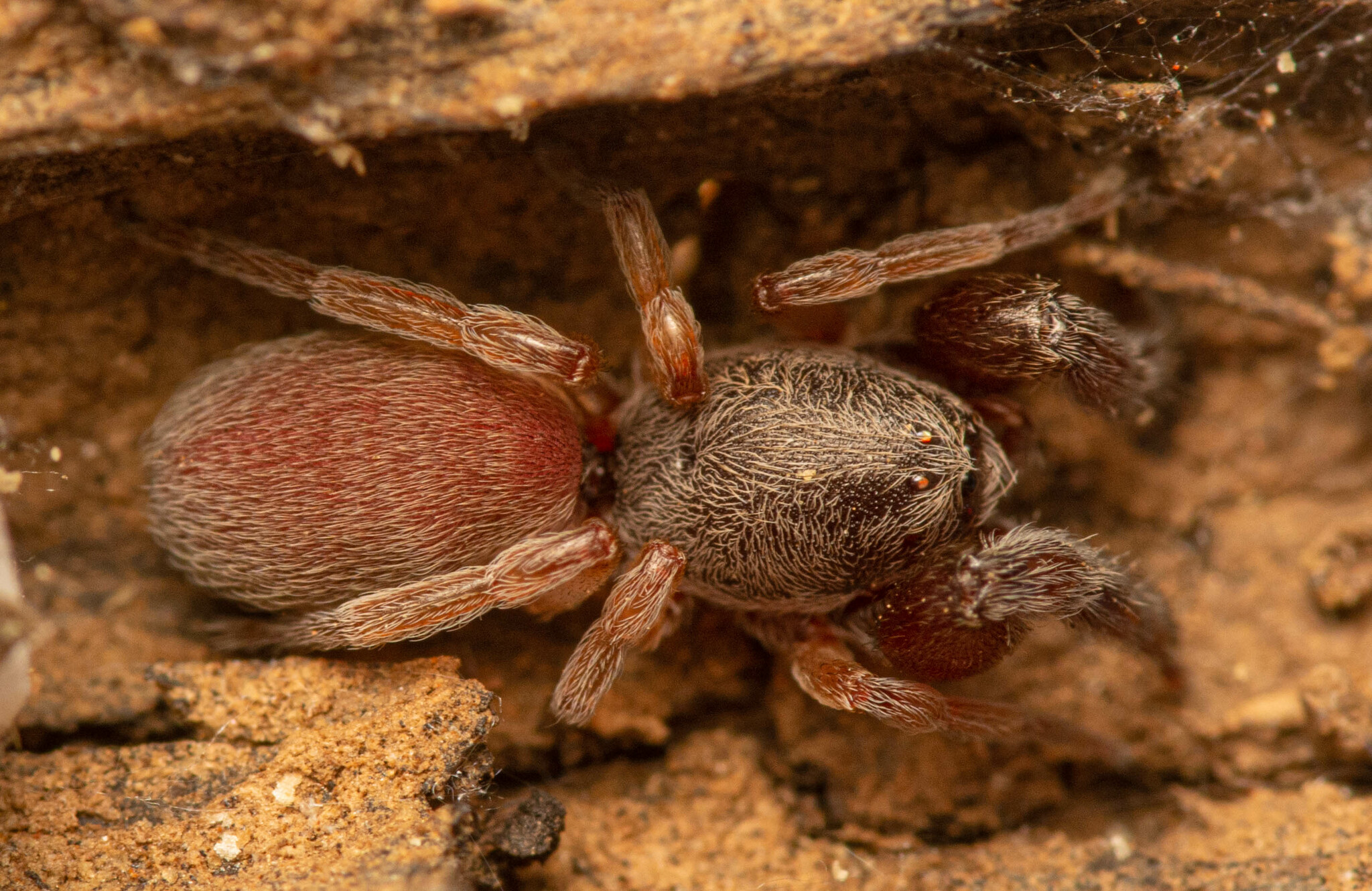
female

The species is known only from the female. The carapace is red, abdomen orange-brown, legs II-IV yellow; leg I, sternum, and mouth-parts a little lighter red than carapace. The carapace is covered with fine granules, fairly thickly clothed, especially in the region of the eyes, with grey hairs (blackish in their proximal halves); sternum with evenly distributed coarse round granules much larger than those of the carapace. Total length is 7-8 mm.

== Conservation ==
Palpimanus potteri is listed as Least Concern by the South African National Biodiversity Institute. Although only known from one sex, this species has a wide distribution. There are no significant threats to the species. It is protected in the Hluhluwe Nature Reserve, Mkuze Game, Ndumo Game Reserve and Tembe Elephant Park.

== Taxonomy ==
The species was originally described by Reginald Frederick Lawrence in 1937 from Hluhluwe.
