= Sceliscelis =

Scientific classification
- Kingdom: Animalia
- Phylum: Arthropoda
- Subphylum: Chelicerata
- Class: Arachnida
- Order: Araneae
- Infraorder: Araneomorphae
- Family: Palpimanidae
- Genus: Sceliscelis; Oketch & Li, 2020
- Species: S. marshi

Binomial name
- Sceliscelis marshi Oketch & Li, 2020

Genus of spiders

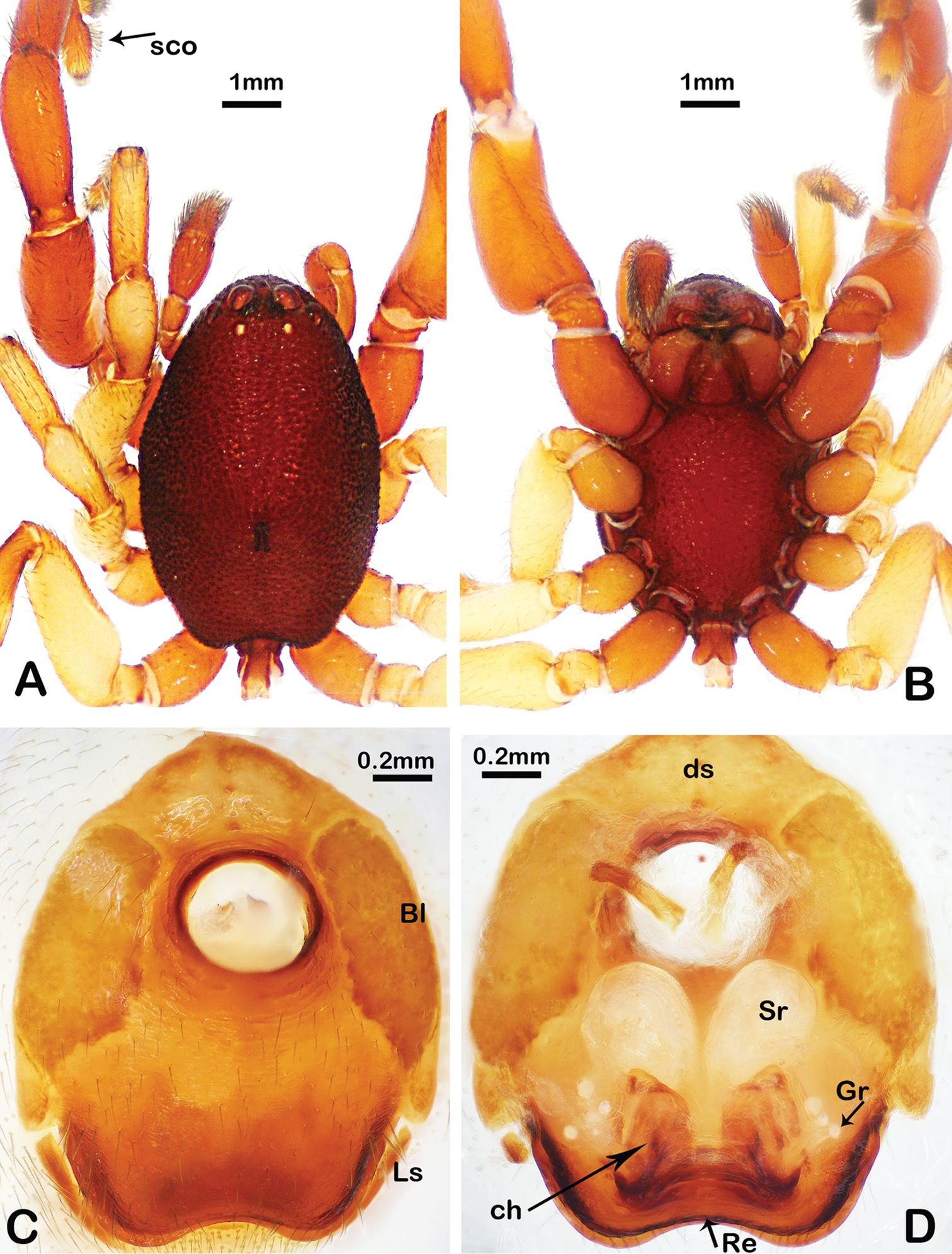
Sceliscelis marshi sp. nov., female paratype. Cephalothorax A dorsal and B ventral aspects C, D endogyne, ventral and dorsal aspects, respectively. Abbreviations: Bl – book lung operculum, ch – receptive chamber, ds – dorsal portion of scutum, Gr – grape-shaped glands, Ls – lateral sclerite, Re – rigid extension of posterior wall of epigastric fold, sco – scopula, Sr – sac like receptacle. Scale bars: 1 mm (A, B), 0.2 mm (C, D).

Sceliscelis is a monotypic genus of east African palp-footed spiders containing the single species, Sceliscelis marshi. It was first described by A. D. Oketch, S. Zonstein and E. N. Kioko in 2020, and it has only been found in Kenya.
