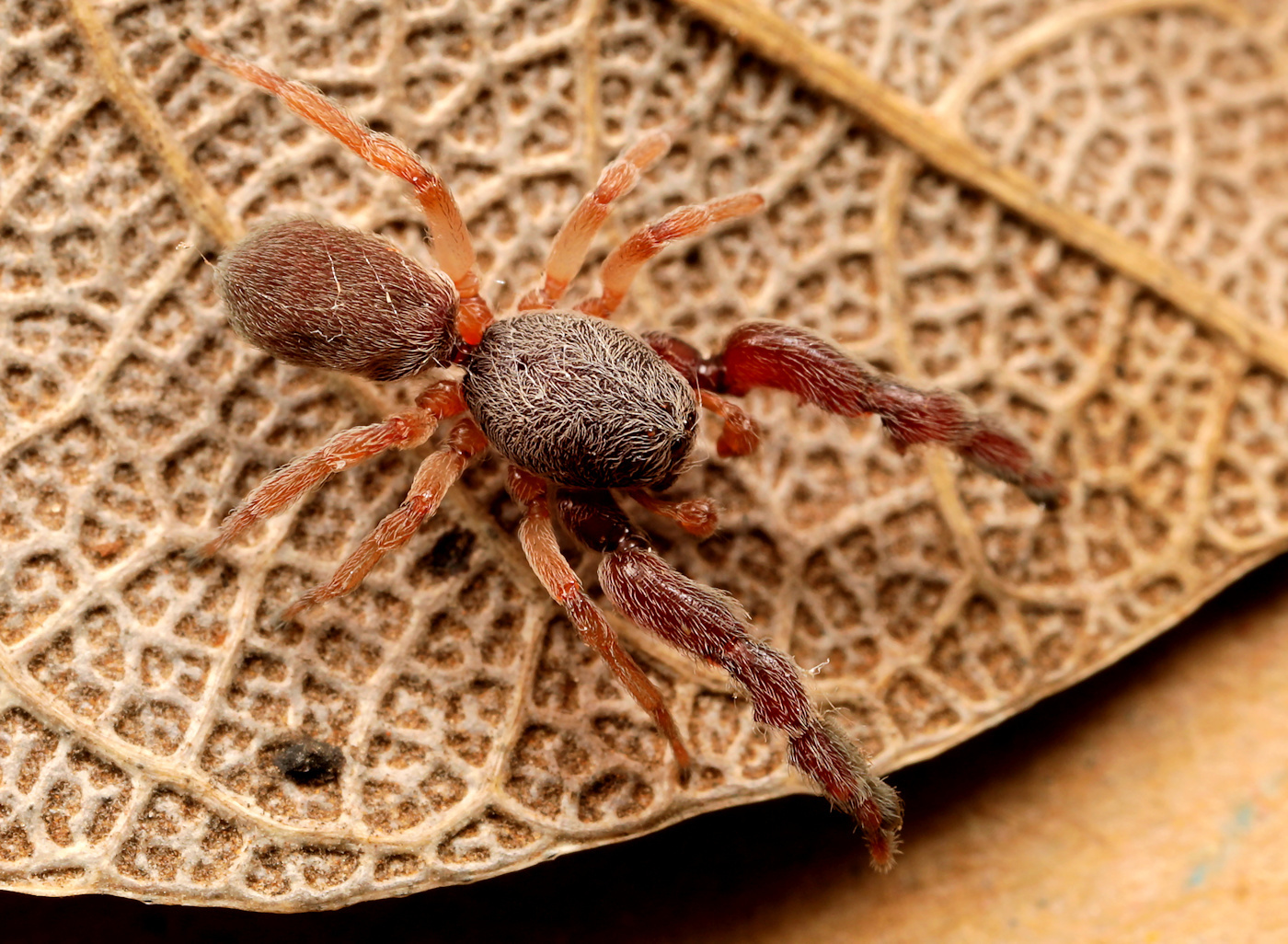

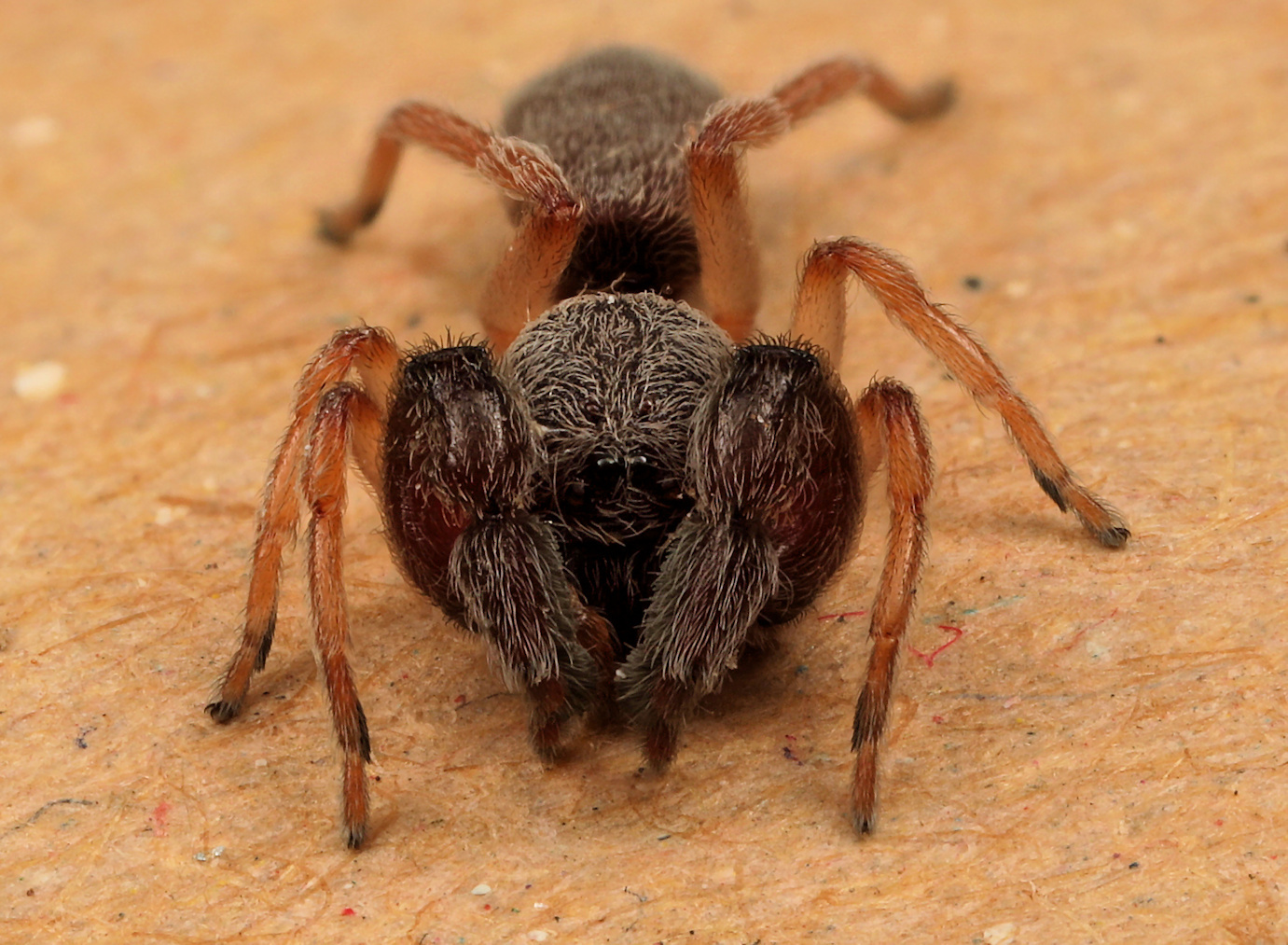

Scientific classification
- Kingdom: Animalia
- Phylum: Arthropoda
- Subphylum: Chelicerata
- Class: Arachnida
- Order: Araneae
- Infraorder: Araneomorphae
- Family: Palpimanidae
- Genus: Palpimanus
- Species: P. tuberculatus

Binomial name
- Palpimanus tuberculatus Lawrence, 1952

= Palpimanus tuberculatus =

Estcourt Palp-Footed Spider

Species of spider

Palpimanus tuberculatus is a species of spider in the family Palpimanidae. It is endemic to South Africa and is commonly known as the Estcourt palp-footed spider.

== Distribution ==
Palpimanus tuberculatus is known only from the type locality Estcourt in KwaZulu-Natal.

== Habitat and ecology ==
The species is a free-living ground dweller sampled from the Savanna biome at 1573 m above sea level.

== Description ==
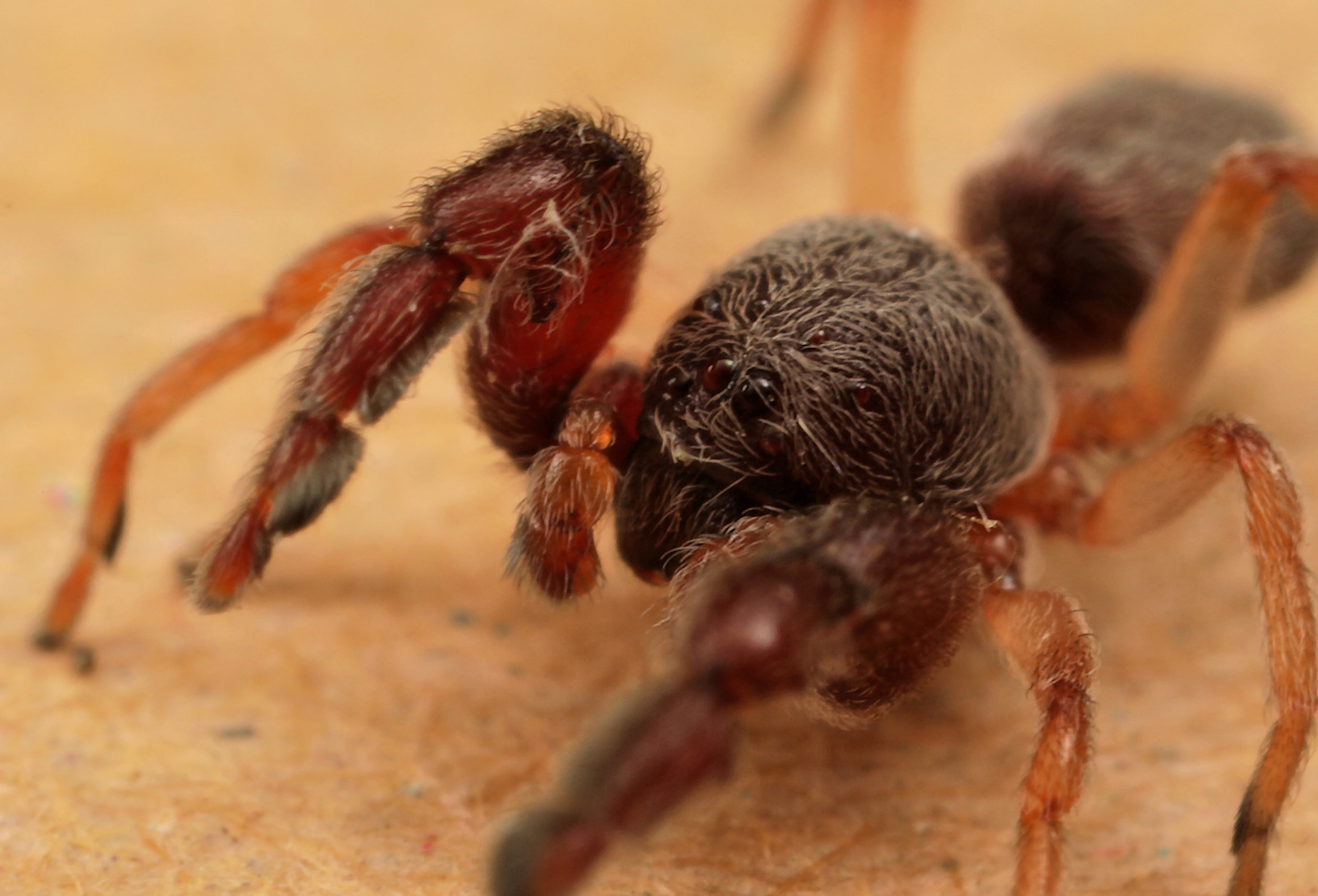

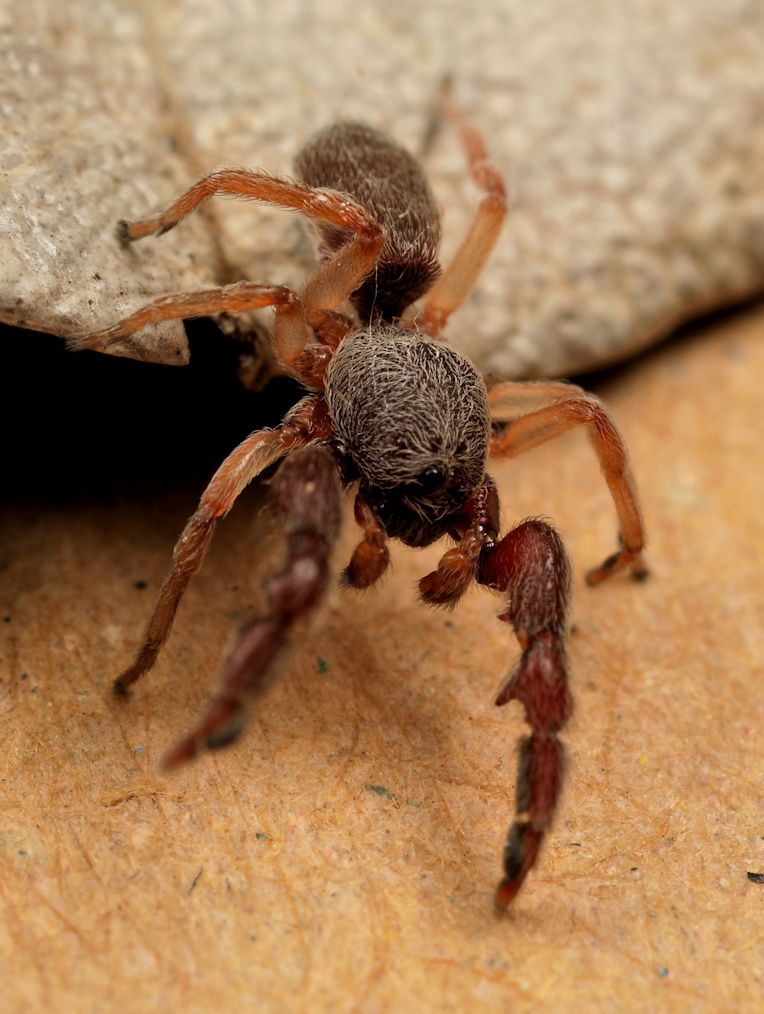

== Conservation ==
Palpimanus tuberculatus is listed as Data Deficient for taxonomic reasons. The status of the species remains obscure and more sampling is needed to collect the female and to determine the species range. Threats to the species are unknown.

== Taxonomy ==
The species was originally described by Reginald Frederick Lawrence in 1952. It is known only from the male.
