= Palpimanus aureus =

Scientific classification
- Kingdom: Animalia
- Phylum: Arthropoda
- Subphylum: Chelicerata
- Class: Arachnida
- Order: Araneae
- Infraorder: Araneomorphae
- Family: Palpimanidae
- Genus: Palpimanus
- Species: P. aureus

Binomial name
- Palpimanus aureus Lawrence, 1927

Species of spider

Palpimanus aureus is a species of spider in the family Palpimanidae. It occurs in Namibia and South Africa.

== Distribution ==
Palpimanus aureus is known from Namibia and South Africa. In South Africa, it is recorded from several localities in Limpopo.

== Habitat and ecology ==
The species is a free-living ground dweller sampled from the Savanna biome at altitudes ranging from 531 to 1245 m above sea level.

== Description ==
The species can be recognized by the red carapace, sternum, and mouth-parts, orange anterior pair of legs and the remaining legs yellow; abdomen dull golden, thickly covered with fine black hairs.

The posterior median eyes are oblong, white, resembling those of Diaphorocellus, less than a short diameter apart. Front legs with tibia shorter than the patella and provided with club-shaped scopular setae on metatarsi and tarsi.

== Conservation ==
Palpimanus aureus is listed as Data Deficient for taxonomic reasons. Identification is still problematic and additional collecting is needed to sample adults. Threats to the species are not suspected to be significant and it is protected in Lekgalameetse Nature Reserve and Limpopo Valley Nature Reserve.

== Taxonomy ==
The species was originally described by Reginald Frederick Lawrence in 1927 from Namibia from a juvenile male specimen.
