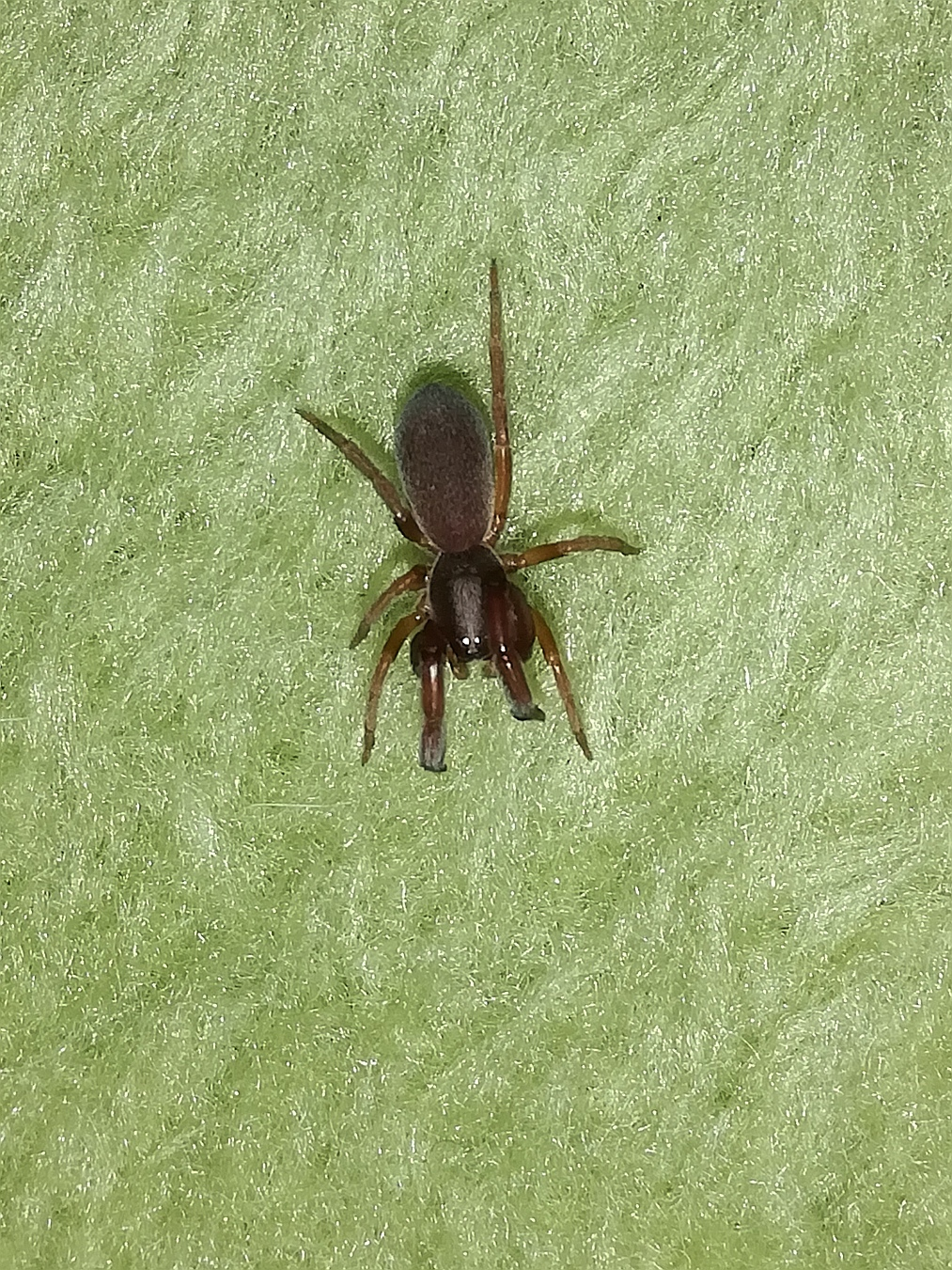

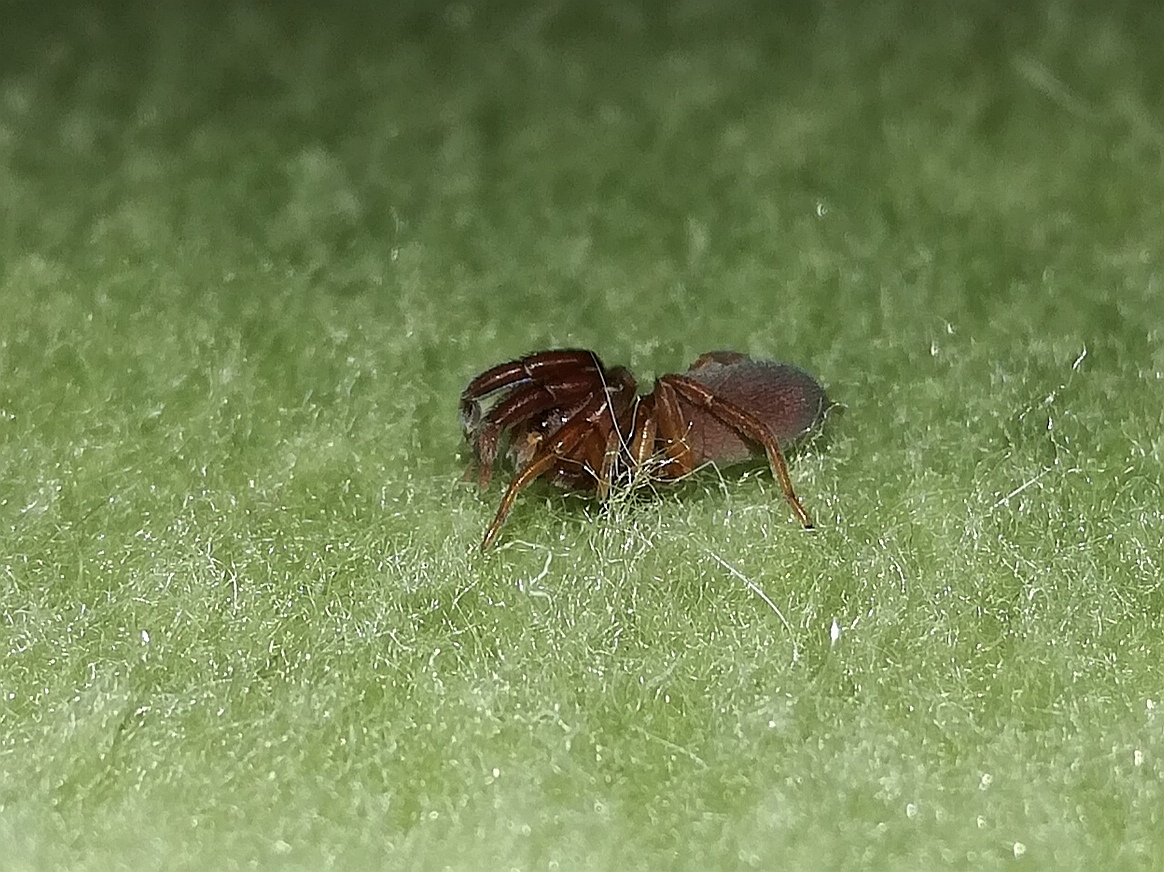

Scientific classification
- Kingdom: Animalia
- Phylum: Arthropoda
- Subphylum: Chelicerata
- Class: Arachnida
- Order: Araneae
- Infraorder: Araneomorphae
- Family: Palpimanidae
- Genus: Palpimanus
- Species: P. globulifer

Binomial name
- Palpimanus globulifer Simon, 1893

= Palpimanus globulifer =

Grahamstown Palp-Footed Spider

Species of spider

Palpimanus globulifer is a species of spider in the family Palpimanidae. It is endemic to South Africa and is commonly known as the Grahamstown palp-footed spider.

== Distribution ==
Palpimanus globulifer is known from a few localities in the Eastern Cape. Notable locations include Addo Elephant National Park.

== Habitat and ecology ==
The species is a free-running ground dweller sampled from the Fynbos and Thicket biomes at altitudes ranging from 7 to 552 m above sea level.

== Description ==
The species is known only from the male, which has a body size 6-10 mm. The carapace is narrow with band of white hair, sternum and front legs are dark red, with the rest of legs reddish brown. The abdomen is dull golden, covered with grey hair layer.

== Conservation ==
Palpimanus globulifer is listed as Data Deficient for taxonomic reasons. The status of the species remains obscure and more sampling is needed to collect the female and to determine the species range. It is protected in the Addo Elephant National Park.

== Taxonomy ==
The species was originally described by Eugène Simon in 1893 from Grahamstown (now Makhanda). It is known only from the male.
