= Palpimanus leppanae =

Scientific classification
- Kingdom: Animalia
- Phylum: Arthropoda
- Subphylum: Chelicerata
- Class: Arachnida
- Order: Araneae
- Infraorder: Araneomorphae
- Family: Palpimanidae
- Genus: Palpimanus
- Species: P. leppanae

Binomial name
- Palpimanus leppanae Pocock, 1902

Species of spider

Palpimanus leppanae is a species of spider in the family Palpimanidae. It is endemic to South Africa.

== Distribution ==
Palpimanus leppanae is known only from the type locality Jansenville in the Eastern Cape.

== Habitat and ecology ==
The species is a free-living ground dweller sampled from the Thicket biome at 444 m above sea level.

== Description ==
P. leppanae can be recognized by the arrangement of the eyes. The posterior eye row is straight and lies far back, the posterior median eyes are about five or six diameters apart, the distance between them median quadrangle very narrowed in front, very long, considerably more than twice as long as its posterior width and more than four times its anterior width. Eyes of anterior row close-set, procurved, lower edge of medians only a little higher than upper edge of laterals, which are much smaller.

The clypeus is low, only about equal to the height of the quadrangle formed by the eyes of the anterior line, the laterals of which are about twice their diameter above it.

== Conservation ==
Palpimanus leppanae is listed as Data Deficient for taxonomic reasons. The status of the species remains obscure and more sampling is needed to collect the male and to determine the species range.

== Taxonomy ==
The species was originally described by Reginald Innes Pocock in 1902. It is known only from the female.
