= Palpimanus crudeni =

Scientific classification
- Kingdom: Animalia
- Phylum: Arthropoda
- Subphylum: Chelicerata
- Class: Arachnida
- Order: Araneae
- Infraorder: Araneomorphae
- Family: Palpimanidae
- Genus: Palpimanus
- Species: P. crudeni

Binomial name
- Palpimanus crudeni Lessert, 1936

Species of spider

Palpimanus crudeni is a species of spider in the family Palpimanidae. It occurs in Mozambique and South Africa .

== Distribution ==
Palpimanus crudeni is known from Mozambique and South Africa. In South Africa, it is recorded from the Eastern Cape and Western Cape provinces.

== Habitat and ecology ==
The species is a free-running ground dweller sampled from the Fynbos, Indian Ocean Coastal Belt and Nama Karoo biomes at altitudes ranging from 52 to 588 m above sea level.

== Conservation ==
Palpimanus crudeni is listed as Data Deficient for taxonomic reasons. The placement of the species is problematic as the female is still unknown. Threats to the species are unknown. It is protected in the Swartberg Nature Reserve and Addo Elephant National Park.

== Taxonomy ==
The species was originally described by Roger de Lessert in 1936 from Mozambique. It is known only from the male.
