= Palpimanus hesperius =

Scientific classification
- Domain: Eukaryota
- Kingdom: Animalia
- Phylum: Arthropoda
- Subphylum: Chelicerata
- Class: Arachnida
- Order: Araneae
- Infraorder: Araneomorphae
- Family: Palpimanidae
- Genus: Palpimanus
- Species: P. hesperius

Binomial name
- Palpimanus hesperius Simon, 1907

Species of spider

Palpimanus hesperius is a spider species of the family Palpimanidae that is endemic on São Tomé Island. It was first named in 1907 by Eugène Simon.

Its female holotype measures from 8 to 9 mm
