= Palpimanus armatus =

Armed Palp-Footed Spider

Conservation status
- Least Concern (SANBI Red List)

Scientific classification
- Kingdom: Animalia
- Phylum: Arthropoda
- Subphylum: Chelicerata
- Class: Arachnida
- Order: Araneae
- Infraorder: Araneomorphae
- Family: Palpimanidae
- Genus: Palpimanus
- Species: P. armatus

Binomial name
- Palpimanus armatus Pocock, 1898

Species of spider

Palpimanus armatus is a species of spider in the family Palpimanidae. It is endemic to South Africa and is commonly known as the armed palp-footed spider.

== Distribution ==
Palpimanus armatus is known from three provinces in South Africa, KwaZulu-Natal, Limpopo, and Mpumalanga.

== Habitat and ecology ==
The species is a free-running ground dweller sampled from pitfall traps. It inhabits the Indian Ocean Coastal Belt, Grassland and Savanna biomes at altitudes ranging from 17 to 1734 m above sea level.

== Description ==
The female has carapace, anterior legs, pedipalps, sternum and mouth-parts, and epigastric area mahogany-brown, remaining legs yellowish red, these parts rather scantily covered with greyish-yellow hairs, abdomen more thickly covered with hairs of the same tint, brownish yellow beneath.

The male differs from the female principally in the structure of the anterior legs, the femur of which is higher; the patella is armed externally with a stout conical process, and the tibia is arched and is furnished with a thinner backwardly directed process close to the base. Body size ranges from 11-13 mm.

== Conservation ==
Palpimanus armatus is listed as Least Concern by the South African National Biodiversity Institute due to its wide geographical range. The species is protected in the Kruger National Park, Sterkspruit Nature Reserve and Polokwane Nature Reserve.

== Taxonomy ==
The species was originally described by Reginald Innes Pocock in 1898 from Durban. It is known from both sexes.
