= Palpimanus namaquensis =

Northern Cape Palp-Footed Spider

Conservation status
- Least Concern (SANBI Red List)

Scientific classification
- Kingdom: Animalia
- Phylum: Arthropoda
- Subphylum: Chelicerata
- Class: Arachnida
- Order: Araneae
- Infraorder: Araneomorphae
- Family: Palpimanidae
- Genus: Palpimanus
- Species: P. namaquensis

Binomial name
- Palpimanus namaquensis Simon, 1910

Species of spider

Palpimanus namaquensis is a species of spider in the family Palpimanidae. It occurs in Namibia and South Africa and is commonly known as the Northern Cape palp-footed spider.

== Distribution ==
Palpimanus namaquensis is known from Namibia and South Africa. In South Africa, it is known from several localities in the Northern Cape.

== Habitat and ecology ==
The species is a free-living ground dweller. The type specimen was found in rocky areas. It has been sampled from the Succulent Karoo and Desert biomes at altitudes ranging from 231 to 1187 m above sea level.

== Conservation ==
Palpimanus namaquensis is listed as Least Concern by the South African National Biodiversity Institute due to its wide geographical range. There are no significant threats to the species. It is protected in Augrabies National Park, Benfontein Game Reserve and Richtersveld Transfrontier National Park.

== Taxonomy ==
The species was originally described by Eugène Simon in 1910 from Kamaggas in the Northern Cape. It was redescribed by Zonstein & Marusik in 2019.
