= Sitamacho =

Scientific classification
- Kingdom: Animalia
- Phylum: Arthropoda
- Subphylum: Chelicerata
- Class: Arachnida
- Order: Araneae
- Infraorder: Araneomorphae
- Family: Palpimanidae
- Genus: Sitamacho; Wood, Kulkarni, Ramírez & Scharff, 2024

Type species
- S. tao Wood, Kulkarni, Ramírez & Scharff, 2024

Species
- 4, see text

Genus of spiders

Sitamacho is a genus of spiders in the family Palpimanidae.

== Distribution ==
Sitamacho is distributed in East Africa.

== Description ==
Members of this genus have a body length of about 2 mm.

== Etymology ==
The genus name consists of Swahili sita (six) and macho (eyes).

== Species ==
As of January 2026, this genus includes four species:

- Sitamacho lesserti (Berland, 1920) – Kenya
- Sitamacho machondogo (Oketch & Li, 2020) – Kenya
- Sitamacho scabra (Simon & Fage, 1922) – Kenya
- Sitamacho tao Wood, Kulkarni, Ramírez & Scharff, 2024 – Tanzania
