= Palpimanus pseudarmatus =

Pietermaritzburg Palp-Footed Spider

Conservation status
- Least Concern (SANBI Red List)

Scientific classification
- Kingdom: Animalia
- Phylum: Arthropoda
- Subphylum: Chelicerata
- Class: Arachnida
- Order: Araneae
- Infraorder: Araneomorphae
- Family: Palpimanidae
- Genus: Palpimanus
- Species: P. pseudarmatus

Binomial name
- Palpimanus pseudarmatus Lawrence, 1952

Species of spider

Palpimanus pseudarmatus is a species of spider in the family Palpimanidae. It is endemic to South Africa and is commonly known as the Pietermaritzburg palp-footed spider.

== Distribution ==
Palpimanus pseudarmatus is recorded from two provinces in South Africa: KwaZulu-Natal and Limpopo.

== Habitat and ecology ==
The species is a free-living ground dweller sampled from the Savanna biome at altitudes ranging from 405 to 1523 m above sea level.

== Description ==
The species is recognized by carapace, mandibles, sternum, mouthparts and epigastric area dark red; leg I red, II-IV reddish-orange; abdomen yellow brown. Posterior row seen from above straight to very slightly procurved; medians white, a little smaller than the laterals and a little nearer to each other than to them. In male patella and tibia armed with tubercle absent in female. Body size 10-11 mm.

== Conservation ==
Palpimanus pseudarmatus is listed as Least Concern by the South African National Biodiversity Institute due to its wide range. There are no significant threats to the species. It is protected in Ophathe Game Reserve, Blouberg Nature Reserve and Western Soutpansberg.

== Taxonomy ==
The species was originally described by Reginald Frederick Lawrence in 1952 from Pietermaritzburg. It is known from both sexes.
