= Palpimanus capensis =

Cape Palp-Footed Spider

Conservation status
- Least Concern (SANBI Red List)

Scientific classification
- Kingdom: Animalia
- Phylum: Arthropoda
- Subphylum: Chelicerata
- Class: Arachnida
- Order: Araneae
- Infraorder: Araneomorphae
- Family: Palpimanidae
- Genus: Palpimanus
- Species: P. capensis

Binomial name
- Palpimanus capensis Simon, 1893

Species of spider

Palpimanus capensis is a species of spider in the family Palpimanidae. It is endemic to South Africa and is commonly known as the Cape palp-footed spider.

== Distribution ==
Palpimanus capensis is recorded from three provinces in South Africa: Eastern Cape, Northern Cape, and Western Cape. Notable locations include Mountain Zebra National Park, Karoo National Park, and Table Mountain National Park.

== Habitat and ecology ==
P. capensis is a free-living ground dweller sampled from the Fynbos, Forest, Grassland and Thicket biomes at altitudes ranging from 7 to 1513 m above sea level.

== Conservation ==
Palpimanus capensis is listed as Least Concern by the South African National Biodiversity Institute due to its wide range. There are no significant threats to the species. It is protected in the Mountain Zebra National Park, Karoo National Park and Table Mountain National Park.

== Taxonomy ==
The species was originally described by Eugène Simon in 1893 from Port Elizabeth. It is known from both sexes.
