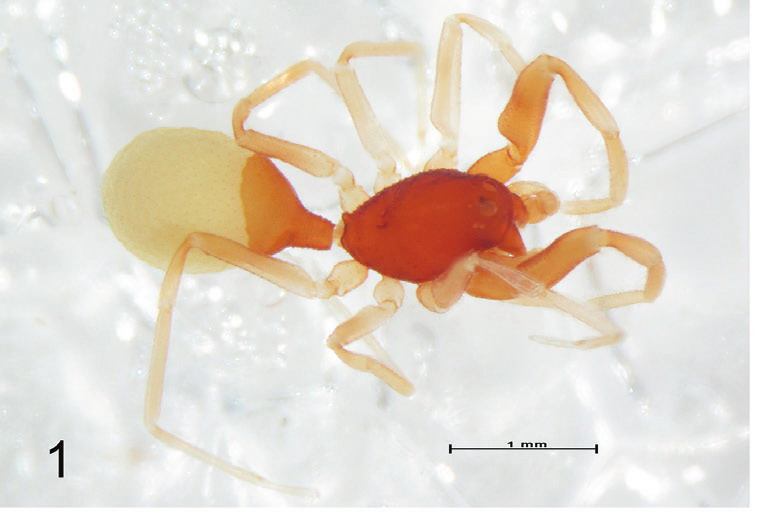
- L. gershomi male

Scientific classification
- Kingdom: Animalia
- Phylum: Arthropoda
- Subphylum: Chelicerata
- Class: Arachnida
- Order: Araneae
- Infraorder: Araneomorphae
- Family: Palpimanidae
- Genus: Levymanus; Zonstein & Marusik, 2013

Type species
- L. gershomi Zonstein & Marusik, 2013

Species
- L. gershomi Zonstein & Marusik, 2013 – Israel, Saudi Arabia, United Arab Emirates; L. ras Zonstein, Marusik & Kovblyuk, 2017 – Ethiopia

= Levymanus =

Genus of spiders

Levymanus is a genus of palp-footed spiders that was first described by S. Zonstein & Y. M. Marusik in 2013. As of June 2019 it contains only two species, found in the United Arab Emirates, Saudi Arabia, Israel, and Ethiopia: L. gershomi and L. ras.
