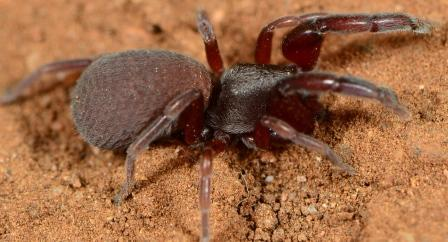
- Female
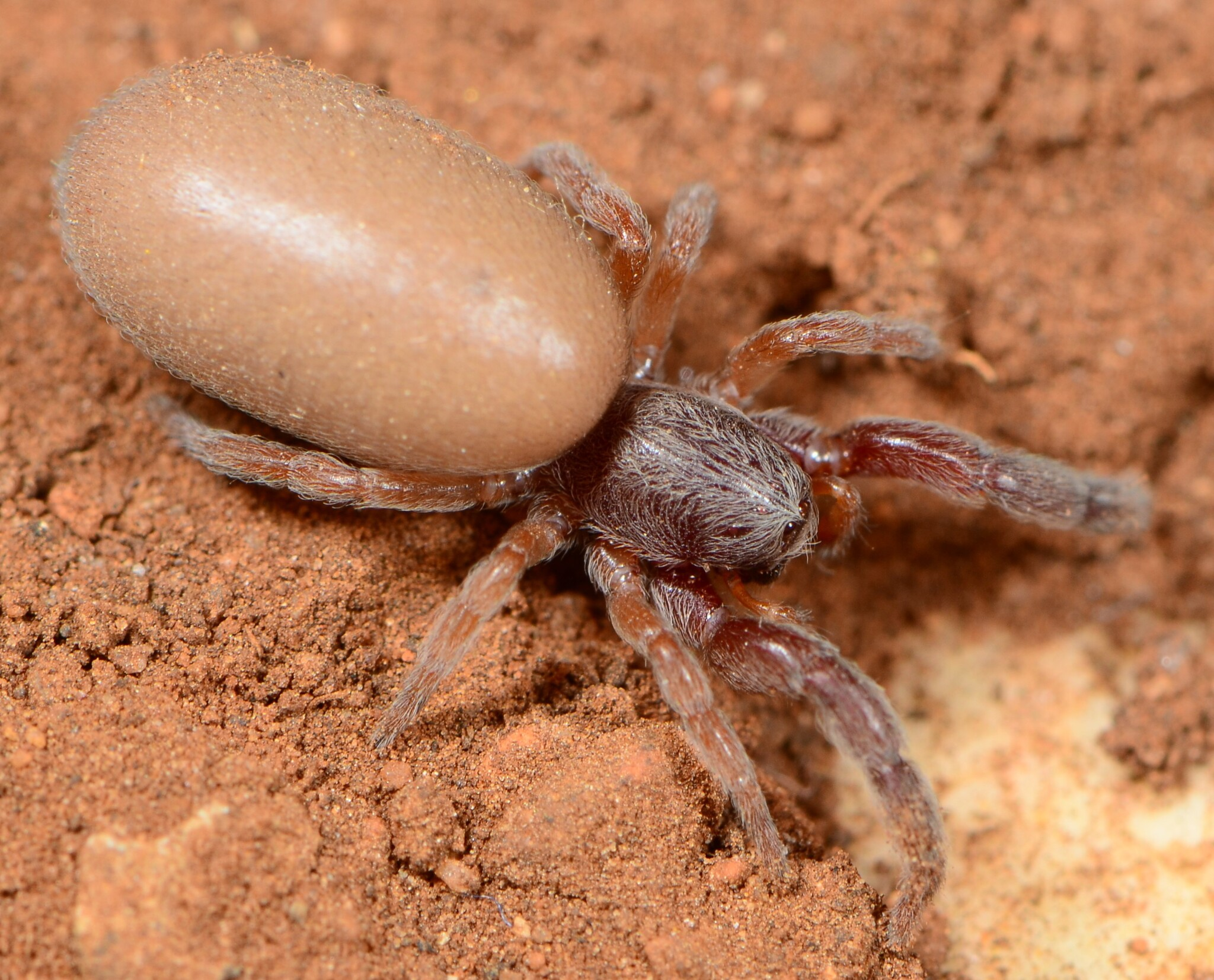
- Juvenile

Scientific classification
- Kingdom: Animalia
- Phylum: Arthropoda
- Subphylum: Chelicerata
- Class: Arachnida
- Order: Araneae
- Infraorder: Araneomorphae
- Family: Palpimanidae
- Genus: Palpimanus
- Species: P. transvaalicus

Binomial name
- Palpimanus transvaalicus Simon, 1893

= Palpimanus transvaalicus =

Transvaal Palp-Footed Spider

Species of spider

Palpimanus transvaalicus is a species of spider in the family Palpimanidae. It is endemic to South Africa and is commonly known as the Transvaal palp-footed spider.

== Distribution ==
Palpimanus transvaalicus is widespread and known from seven provinces in South Africa: Eastern Cape, Free State, Gauteng, KwaZulu-Natal, Limpopo, Mpumalanga, and North West.

== Habitat and ecology ==
The species is a free running ground dweller, active at night. During the day it is frequently found in small irregular saclike retreats made under stones. This species has been recorded from the Grassland, Savanna and Thicket biomes as well as crops such as citrus and cotton at altitudes ranging from 83 to 1951 m above sea level.

== Description ==
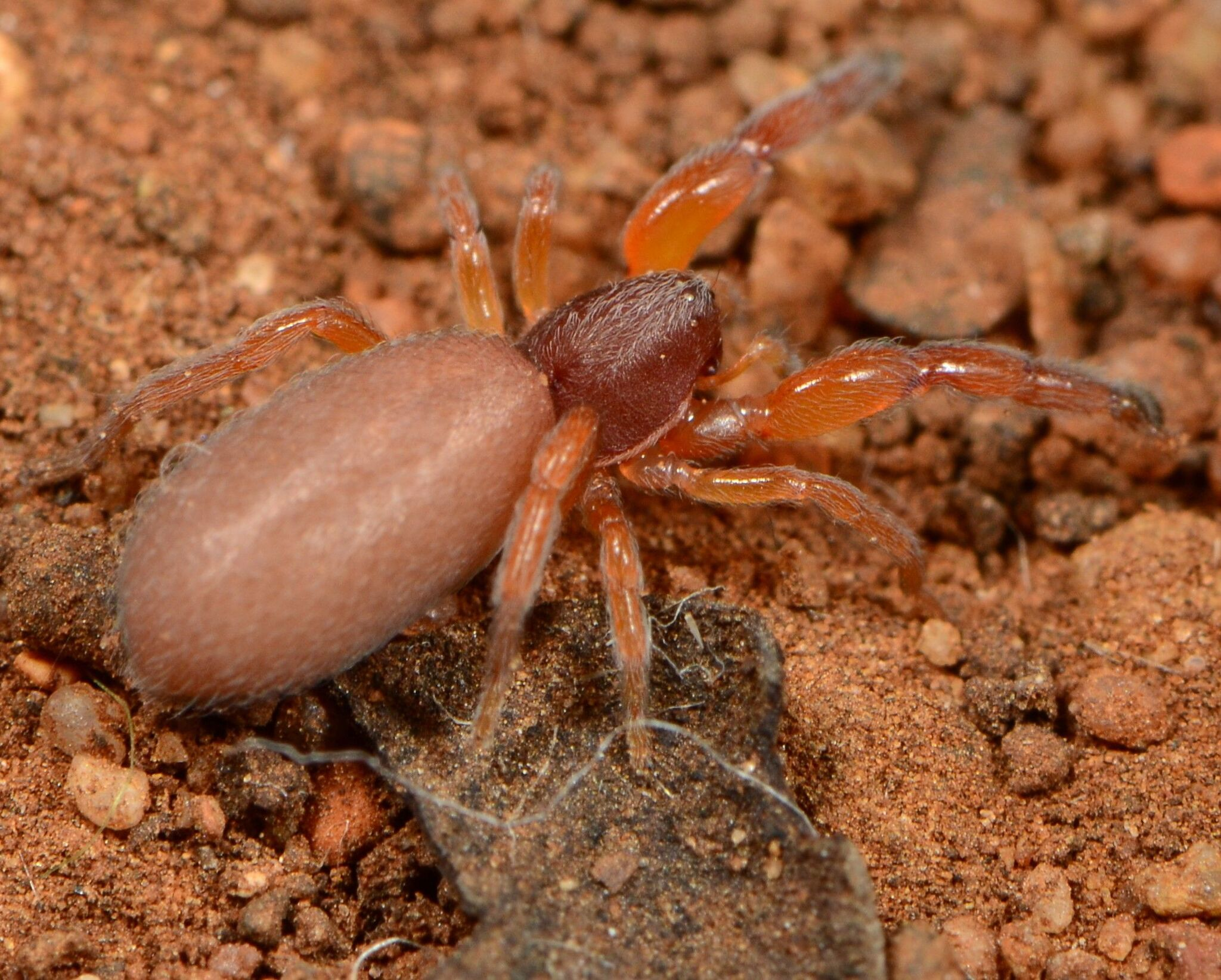
female juvenile

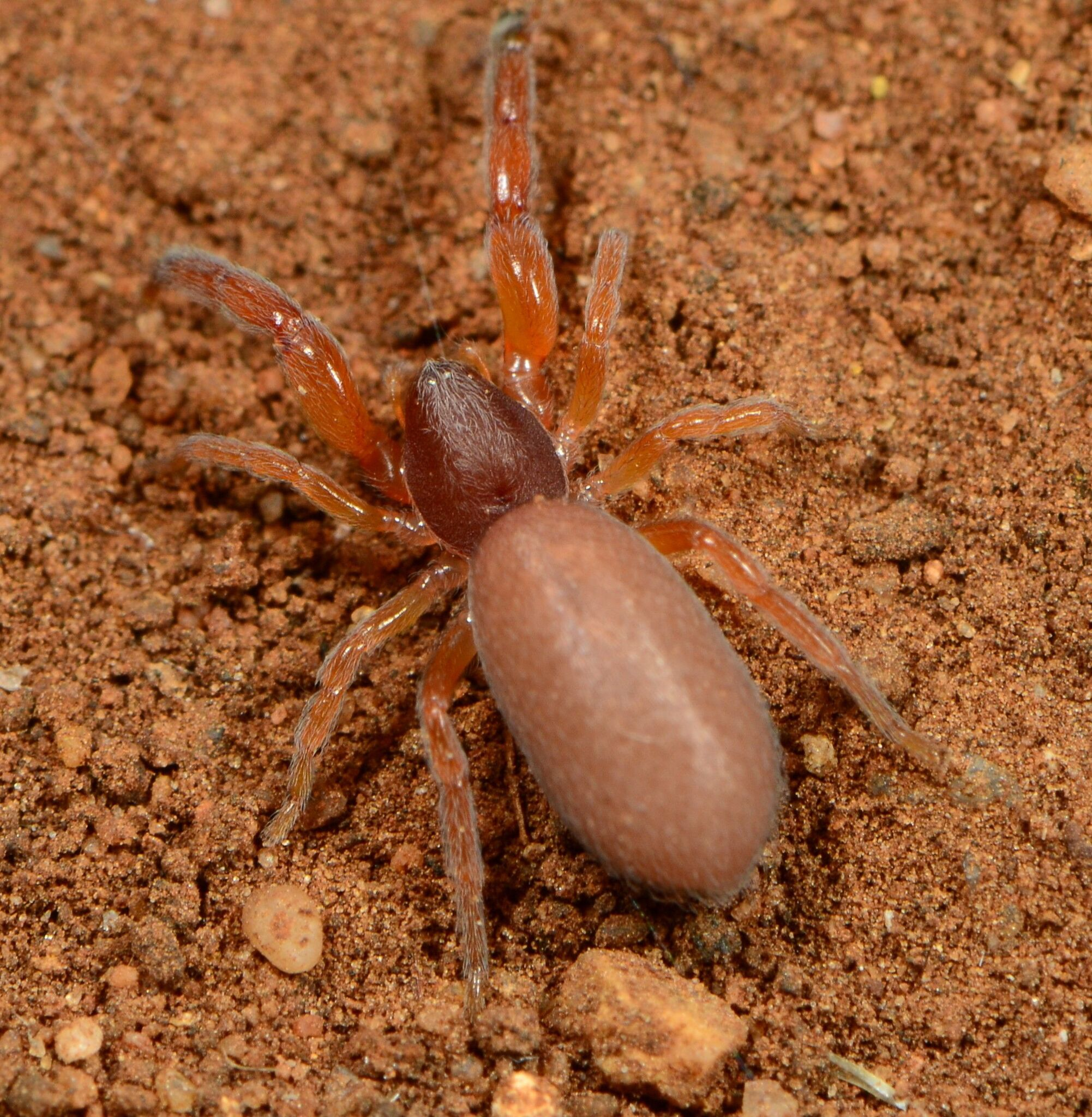
female juvenile

== Conservation ==
Palpimanus transvaalicus is listed as Least Concern by the South African National Biodiversity Institute. Although the species is presently known only from one sex it has a wide geographical range. There are no significant threats to the species. It is protected in more than ten protected areas.

== Taxonomy ==
The species was originally described by Eugène Simon in 1893 with type locality only given as Transvaal. It is known only from the male, though females have been collected but need to be described.
