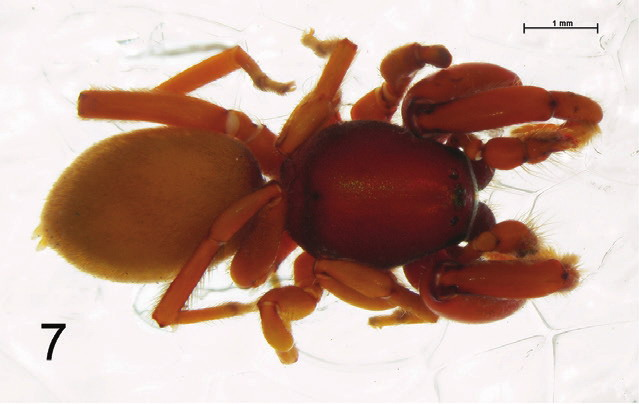
- S. socotranus

Scientific classification
- Kingdom: Animalia
- Phylum: Arthropoda
- Subphylum: Chelicerata
- Class: Arachnida
- Order: Araneae
- Infraorder: Araneomorphae
- Family: Palpimanidae
- Genus: Scelidomachus; Pocock, 1899
- Species: S. socotranus

Binomial name
- Scelidomachus socotranus Pocock, 1899

= Scelidomachus =

Genus of spiders

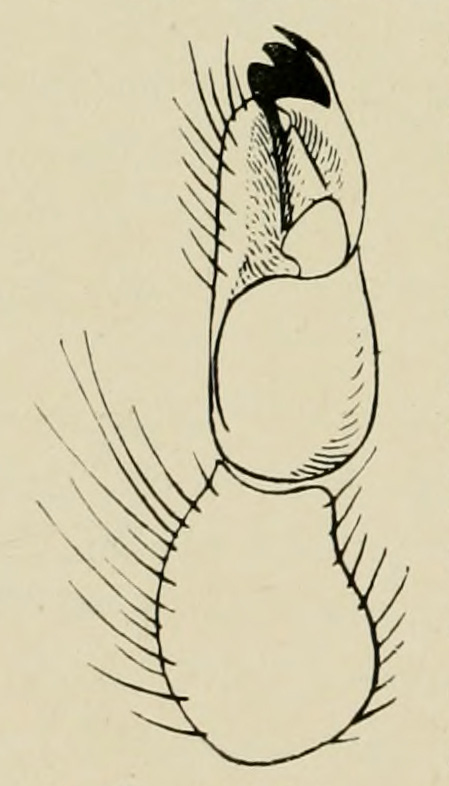
A drawing of the palpus of S. soctranus

Scelidomachus socotranus is a species of spider found on the island of Socotra in the Indian Ocean. It is the only member of its genus.
