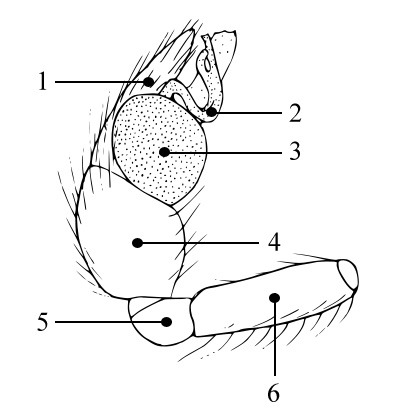
- Anisaedus levii

Scientific classification
- Kingdom: Animalia
- Phylum: Arthropoda
- Subphylum: Chelicerata
- Class: Arachnida
- Order: Araneae
- Infraorder: Araneomorphae
- Family: Palpimanidae
- Genus: Anisaedus; Simon, 1893

Type species
- A. gaujoni Simon, 1893

Species
- 6, see text

Synonyms
- Compsopus Tullgren, 1905

= Anisaedus =

Genus of spiders

Anisaedus is a genus of palp-footed spiders first described by Eugène Louis Simon in 1893.

== Species ==
As of June 2019 it contains six species, found in Africa, Argentina, Chile, Peru, and Ecuador:

- Anisaedus aethiopicus Tullgren, 1910 – Tanzania
- Anisaedus gaujoni Simon, 1893 (type) – Ecuador, Peru
- Anisaedus levii Chickering, 1966 – Africa
- Anisaedus pellucidas Platnick, 1975 – Chile
- Anisaedus rufus (Tullgren, 1905) – Argentina
- Anisaedus stridulans González, 1956 – Peru
