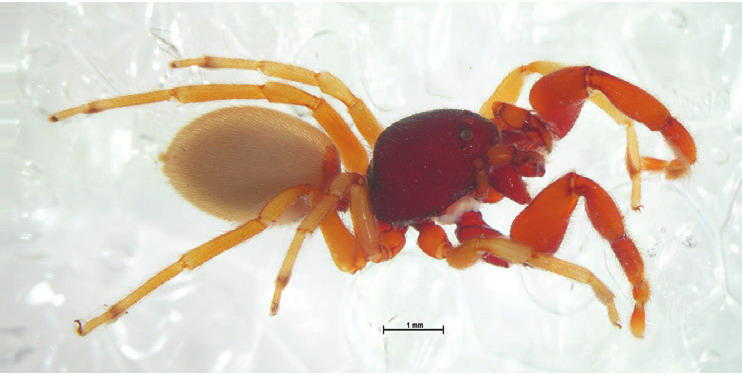
- S. chaperi male

Scientific classification
- Kingdom: Animalia
- Phylum: Arthropoda
- Subphylum: Chelicerata
- Class: Arachnida
- Order: Araneae
- Infraorder: Araneomorphae
- Family: Palpimanidae
- Genus: Sarascelis; Simon, 1887

Type species
- S. chaperi Simon, 1887

Species
- 7, see text

= Sarascelis =

Genus of spiders

Sarascelis is a genus of palp-footed spiders that was first described by Eugène Louis Simon in 1887.

== Species ==
As of June 2019 it contains seven species, found only in Africa and Singapore:

- Sarascelis chaperi Simon, 1887 (type) – Ivory Coast, Guinea-Bissau
- Sarascelis junquai Jézéquel, 1964 – Ivory Coast
- Sarascelis kilimandjari (Berland, 1920) – Tanzania
- Sarascelis lamtoensis Jézéquel, 1964 – Ivory Coast, Ghana
- Sarascelis luteipes Simon, 1887 – Congo, São Tomé and Príncipe
- Sarascelis raffrayi Simon, 1893 – Singapore, India?
- Sarascelis rebiereae Jézéquel, 1964 – Ivory Coast
