= Fernandezina =

Scientific classification
- Kingdom: Animalia
- Phylum: Arthropoda
- Subphylum: Chelicerata
- Class: Arachnida
- Order: Araneae
- Infraorder: Araneomorphae
- Family: Palpimanidae
- Genus: Fernandezina; Birabén, 1951

Type species
- F. pulchra Birabén, 1951

Species
- 17, see text

Genus of spiders

Fernandezina is a genus of South American palp-footed spiders that was first described by M. Birabén in 1951.

== Species ==
As of January 2026, this genus includes seventeen species:

- Fernandezina acuta Platnick, 1975 – Brazil
- Fernandezina andersoni Cala-Riquelme & Agnarsson, 2018 – Colombia
- Fernandezina angeloi Carvalho, Braga-Pereira & Santos, 2024 – Brazil
- Fernandezina dasilvai Platnick, Grismado & Ramírez, 1999 – Brazil
- Fernandezina divisa Platnick, 1975 – Brazil
- Fernandezina eduardoi Cala-Riquelme, Quijano-Cuervo & Sabogal-Gonzáles, 2018 – Colombia
- Fernandezina fernandoi Carvalho, Braga-Pereira & Santos, 2024 – Brazil
- Fernandezina grismadoi Martínez & Gutierrez, 2021 – Colombia
- Fernandezina ilheus Platnick, Grismado & Ramírez, 1999 – Brazil
- Fernandezina jurubatiba Castro, Baptista, Grismado & Ramírez, 2015 – Brazil
- Fernandezina maldonado Platnick, Grismado & Ramírez, 1999 – Peru
- Fernandezina nica R. Ott & A. P. Ott, 2015 – Brazil
- Fernandezina pelta Platnick, 1975 – Brazil
- Fernandezina pulchra Birabén, 1951 – Brazil, Bolivia, Argentina
- Fernandezina saira Buckup & Ott, 2004 – Brazil
- Fernandezina takutu Grismado, 2002 – Guyana
- Fernandezina tijuca Ramírez & Grismado, 1996 – Brazil
