= Chedimanops =

Scientific classification
- Kingdom: Animalia
- Phylum: Arthropoda
- Subphylum: Chelicerata
- Class: Arachnida
- Order: Araneae
- Infraorder: Araneomorphae
- Family: Palpimanidae
- Genus: Chedimanops; Marusik

Type species
- Chedimanops eskovi

Species
- Chedimanops eskovi Zonstein & Marusik, 2017; Chedimanops rwenzorensis Zonstein & Marusik, 2017

Genus of spiders

Chedimanops is a genus of spiders in the Palpimanidae family. It was first described in 2017 by Zonstein & Marusik. As of 2017, it contains 2 species, both from Congo.
