= Badia rugosa =

Scientific classification
- Kingdom: Animalia
- Phylum: Arthropoda
- Subphylum: Chelicerata
- Class: Arachnida
- Order: Araneae
- Infraorder: Araneomorphae
- Family: Palpimanidae
- Genus: Badia; Roewer, 1961
- Species: B. rugosa

Binomial name
- Badia rugosa Roewer, 1961

Genus of spiders

Badia rugosa is species of Senegalese palp-footed spiders (family Palpimanidae). It is the only species in the monotypic genus Badia. The species and genus were first described by Carl Friedrich Roewer in 1961. It is only found in Senegal.
