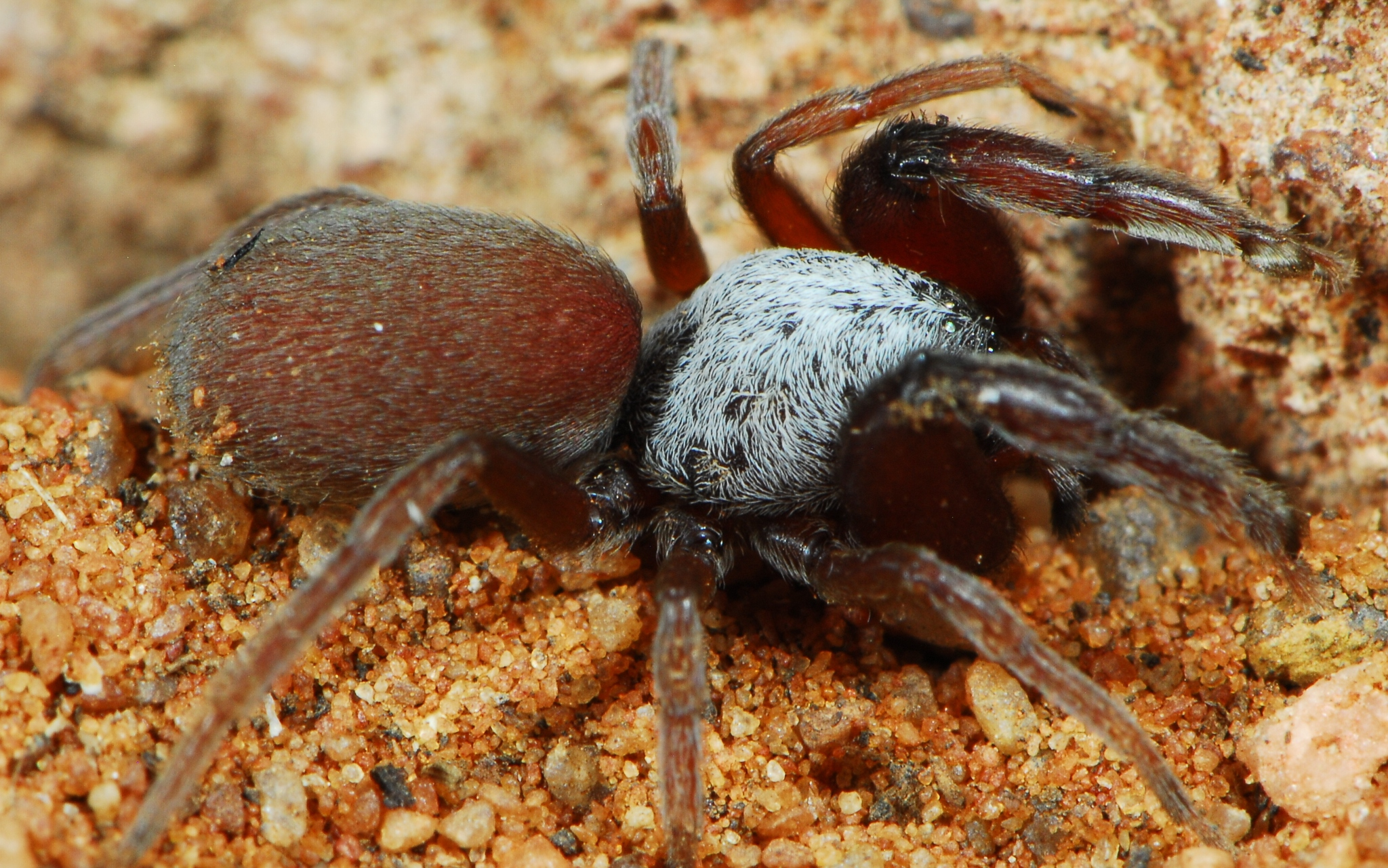
- Female
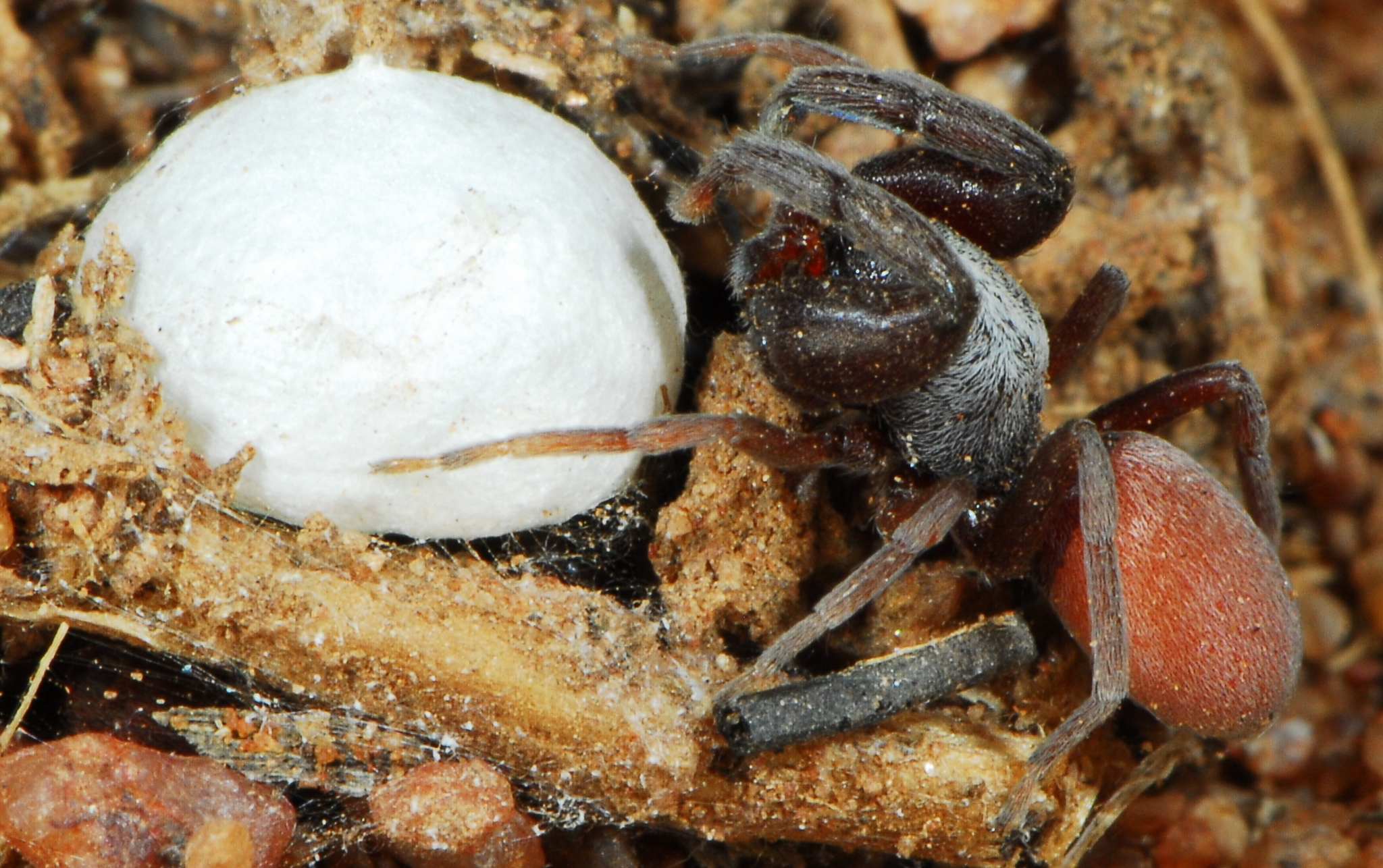
- Female with egg sac

Scientific classification
- Kingdom: Animalia
- Phylum: Arthropoda
- Subphylum: Chelicerata
- Class: Arachnida
- Order: Araneae
- Infraorder: Araneomorphae
- Family: Palpimanidae
- Genus: Palpimanus
- Species: P. paroculus

Binomial name
- Palpimanus paroculus Simon, 1910

= Palpimanus paroculus =

Kamaggas Palp-Footed Spider

Species of spider

Palpimanus paroculus is a species of spider in the family Palpimanidae. It occurs in Namibia and South Africa and is commonly known as the Kamaggas palp-footed spider.

== Distribution ==
Palpimanus paroculus is known from Namibia and South Africa. In South Africa, it is known from the Northern Cape.

== Habitat and ecology ==
The species is a free-living ground dweller sampled from the Savanna and Succulent Karoo biomes. At Tswalu Game Reserve a female with an egg sac was photographed. The round white egg sac was deposited in a silk nest made of stones and plant material. The species occurs at 231 m above sea level.

== Description ==
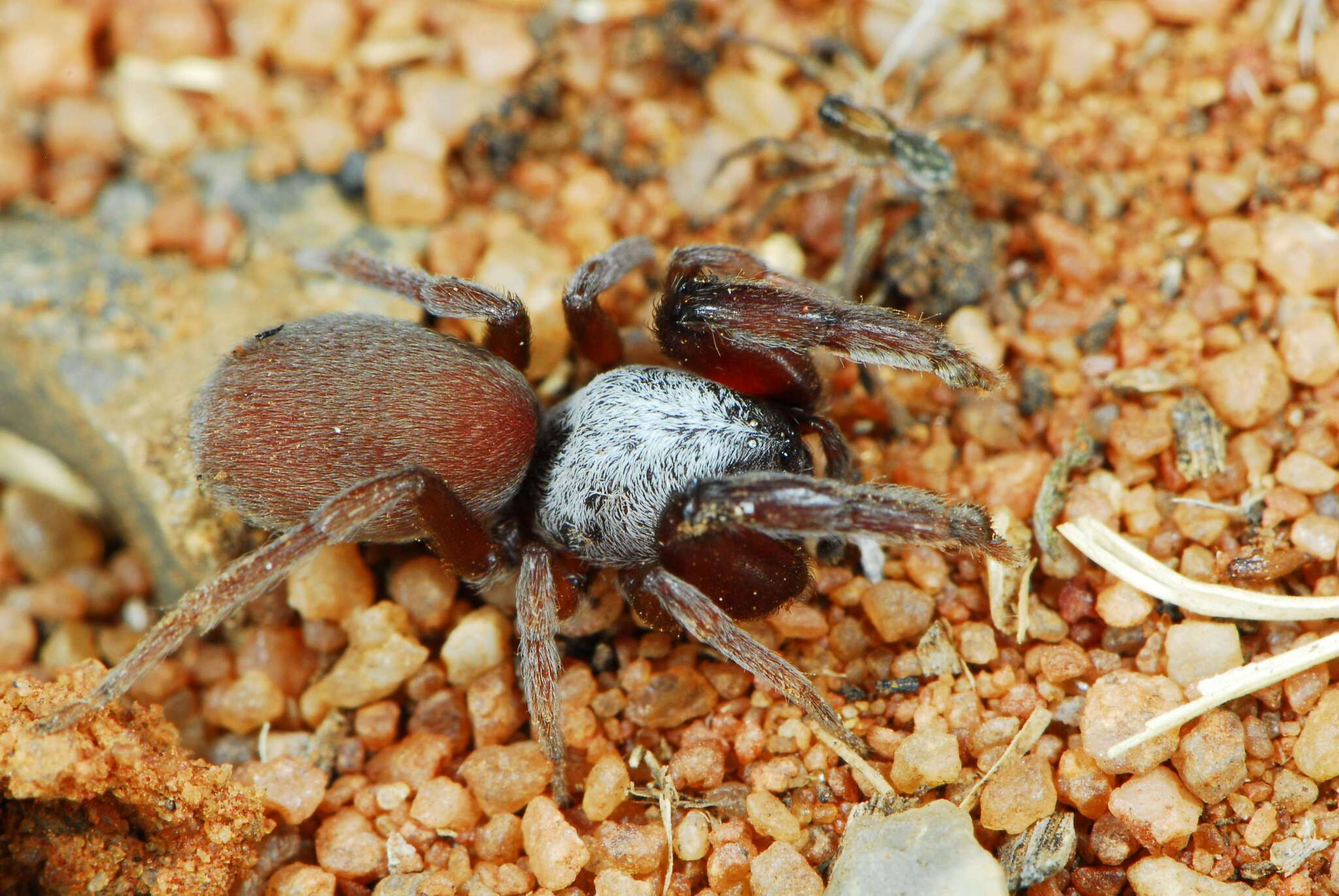
female

== Conservation ==
Palpimanus paroculus is listed as Data Deficient for taxonomic reasons. The status of the species remains obscure and more sampling is needed to collect the male and to determine the species range. Threats to the species are unknown.

== Taxonomy ==
The species was originally described by Eugène Simon in 1910 from the type locality Kamaggas. The type female was redescribed by Zonstein & Marusik in 2019.
