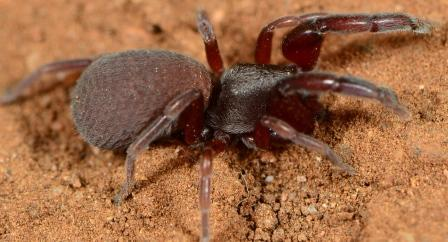
- P. transvaalicus
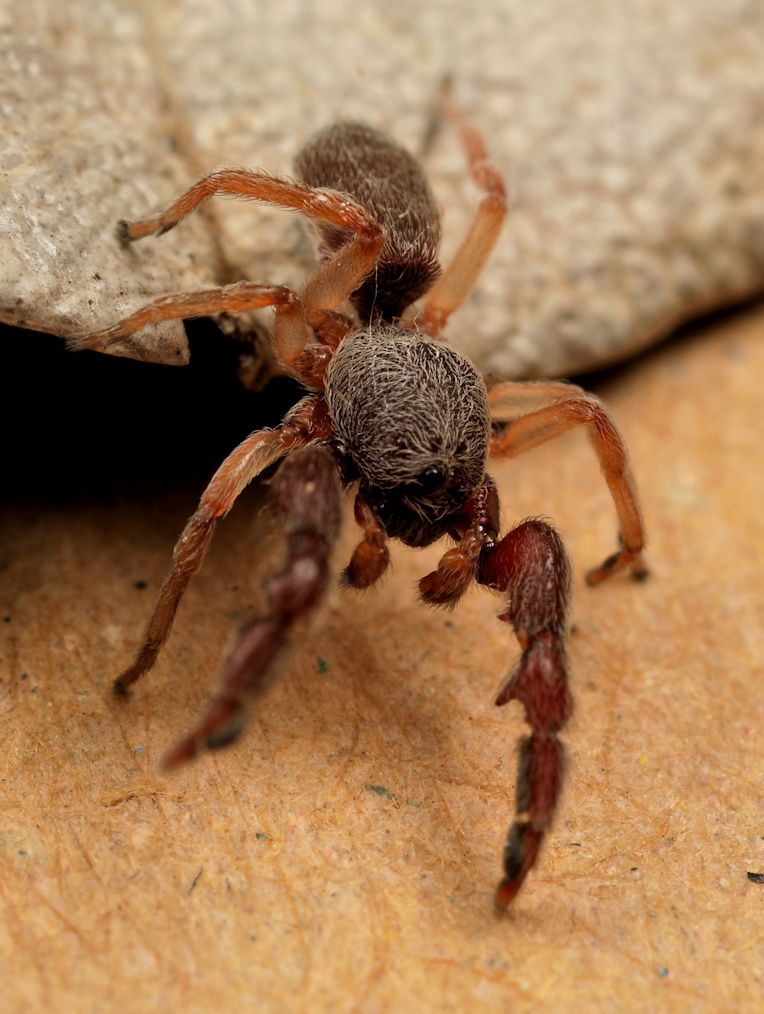
- P. tuberculatus

Scientific classification
- Kingdom: Animalia
- Phylum: Arthropoda
- Subphylum: Chelicerata
- Class: Arachnida
- Order: Araneae
- Infraorder: Araneomorphae
- Family: Palpimanidae
- Genus: Palpimanus; Dufour, 1820

Type species
- P. gibbulus Dufour, 1820

Species
- 43, see text

= Palpimanus =

Genus of spiders

Palpimanus is a genus of palp-footed spiders that was first described by Léon Jean Marie Dufour in 1820.

== Description ==
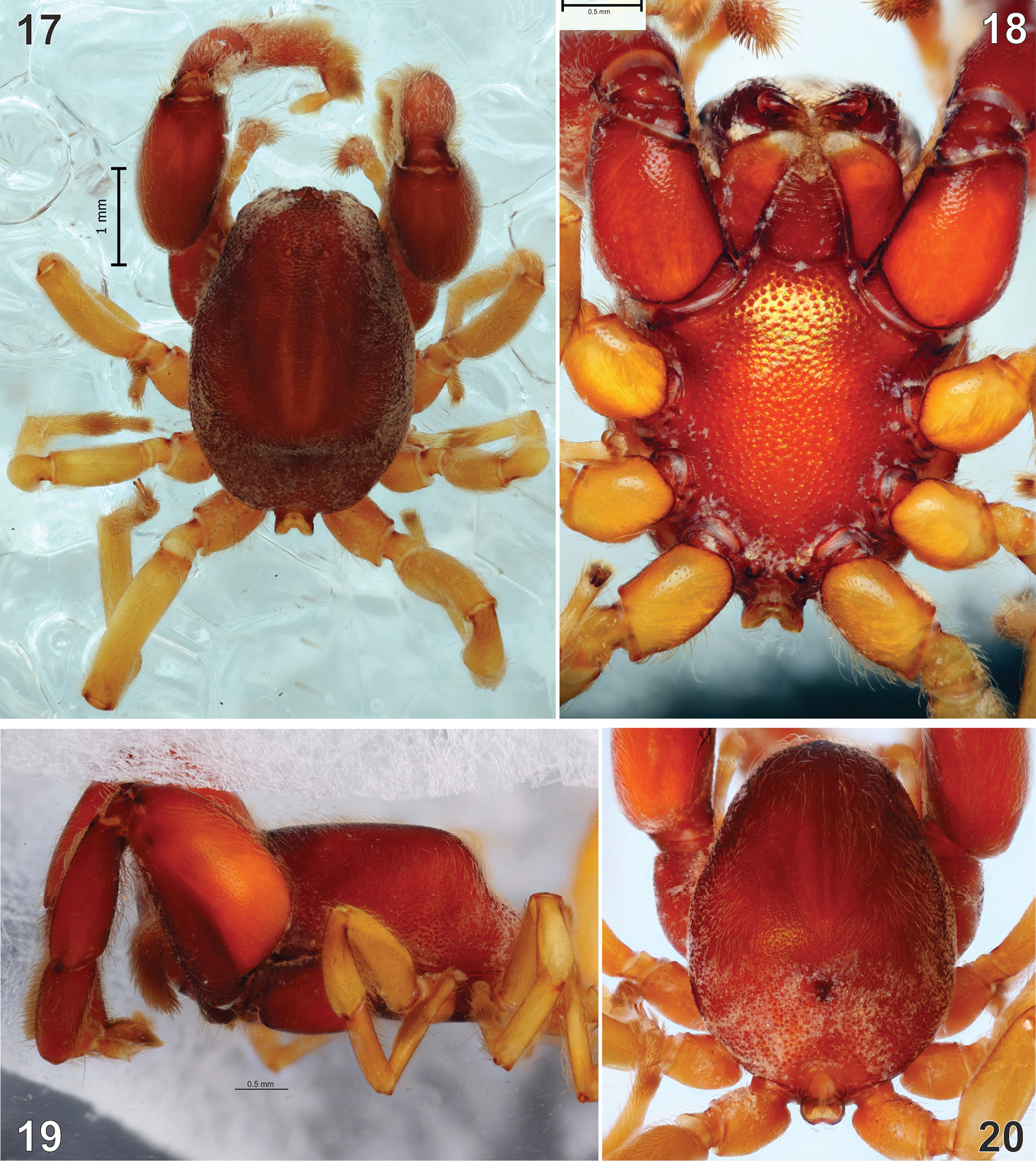
Palpimanus paroculus diagnostic images

Body size ranges from 6-13 mm total length. The carapace is sub-oval in outline and anteriorly truncated. The cephalic region is evenly rounded, sloping gently towards the thoracic region. The fovea is distinct and covered with a hard, coriaceous granular epidermis.

The eyes are eight in number arranged in two rows. The posterior row is straight or recurved with posterior median eyes usually closer to each other than to the laterals. The anterior median eyes are the largest of all the eyes.

The abdomen is ovate with cuticle often coriaceous, and the epigastric region is heavily sclerotised, forming a ring-shaped scutum extending dorsally to encircle the pedicel.

The anterior pair of legs are enlarged with femur I greatly expanded dorsally, and leg I is much stronger than the other three pairs. The patellae are elongated while the metatarsi and tarsi are reduced in size. A thick scopula with spatulate setae is present distally on the prolateral surface of the tibia, metatarsi and tarsi. The tarsal claws are dissimilar in size with anterior tarsi having extremely small claws that are larger on the posterior legs.

== Species ==
As of September 2025, this genus includes 43 species:

- Palpimanus aegyptiacus Kulczyński, 1909 – Algeria, Tunisia, Egypt, Chad
- Palpimanus argentinus Mello-Leitão, 1927 – Argentina
- Palpimanus armatus Pocock, 1898 – South Africa
- Palpimanus aureus Lawrence, 1927 – Namibia, South Africa
- Palpimanus canariensis Kulczyński, 1909 – Canary Islands
- Palpimanus capensis Simon, 1893 – South Africa
- Palpimanus carmania Zamani & Marusik, 2021 – Iran
- Palpimanus crudeni Lessert, 1936 – Mozambique, South Africa
- Palpimanus cyprius Kulczyński, 1909 – Cyprus, Syria, Israel
- Palpimanus denticulatus Hernández-Corral & Ferrández, 2017 – Morocco
- Palpimanus garmiyanus Zamani & Marusik, 2024 – Iraq
- Palpimanus gibbulus Dufour, 1820 – Mediterranean (type species)
- Palpimanus giltayi Lessert, 1936 – Mozambique, South Africa
- Palpimanus globulifer Simon, 1893 – South Africa
- Palpimanus godawan Tripathi & Sankaran, 2023 – India
- Palpimanus hesperius Simon, 1907 – São Tomé and Príncipe
- Palpimanus leppanae Pocock, 1902 – South Africa
- Palpimanus logunovi Fomichev, Marusik & Zonstein, 2023 – Tajikistan
- Palpimanus lualabanus Benoit, 1974 – DR Congo
- Palpimanus maldhok Kuni, Tripathi & Sankaran, 2023 – India
- Palpimanus maroccanus Kulczyński, 1909 – Morocco, Algeria
- Palpimanus meruensis Tullgren, 1910 – Tanzania
- Palpimanus namaquensis Simon, 1910 – Namibia, South Africa
- Palpimanus narsinhmehtai Prajapati, Hun & Raval, 2021 – India
- Palpimanus nubilus Simon, 1910 – Namibia
- Palpimanus orientalis Kulczyński, 1909 – Albania, Greece, Turkey
- Palpimanus paroculus Simon, 1910 – Namibia, South Africa
- Palpimanus persicus Zamani & Marusik, 2021 – Iran
- Palpimanus potteri Lawrence, 1937 – South Africa
- Palpimanus processiger Strand, 1913 – Rwanda
- Palpimanus pseudarmatus Lawrence, 1952 – South Africa
- Palpimanus punctatus Kritscher, 1996 – Malta
- Palpimanus rakhimovi Fomichev, Marusik & Zonstein, 2023 – Uzbekistan
- Palpimanus schmitzi Kulczyński, 1909 – Syria, Israel
- Palpimanus simoni Kulczyński, 1909 – Syria, Lebanon, Israel
- Palpimanus sogdianus Charitonov, 1946 – Uzbekistan
- Palpimanus stridulator Lawrence, 1962 – Namibia
- Palpimanus subarmatus Lawrence, 1947 – South Africa
- Palpimanus transvaalicus Simon, 1893 – South Africa
- Palpimanus tuberculatus Lawrence, 1952 – South Africa
- Palpimanus uncatus Kulczyński, 1909 – Greece, Turkey, Egypt
- Palpimanus vultuosus Simon, 1897 – India
- Palpimanus wagneri Charitonov, 1946 – Uzbekistan
