= Hybosidella =

Scientific classification
- Kingdom: Animalia
- Phylum: Arthropoda
- Subphylum: Chelicerata
- Class: Arachnida
- Order: Araneae
- Infraorder: Araneomorphae
- Family: Palpimanidae
- Genus: Hybosidella; Zonstein & Marusik, 2017
- Species: H. etinde

Binomial name
- Hybosidella etinde Zonstein & Marusik, 2017

Genus of spiders

Hybosidella is a genus of spiders in the Palpimanidae family. It was first described in 2017 by Zonstein & Marusik. As of 2017, it contains only one species, Hybosidella etinde, found in Cameroon.
