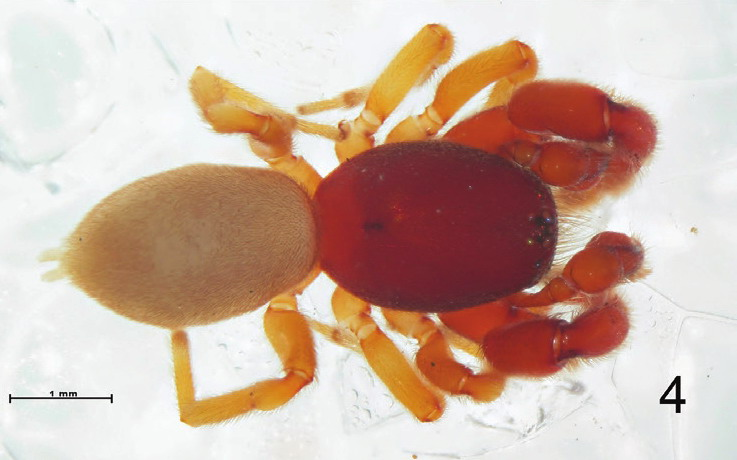

Scientific classification
- Kingdom: Animalia
- Phylum: Arthropoda
- Subphylum: Chelicerata
- Class: Arachnida
- Order: Araneae
- Infraorder: Araneomorphae
- Family: Palpimanidae
- Genus: Scelidocteus; Simon, 1907

Type species
- S. pachypus Simon, 1907

Species
- 7, see text

= Scelidocteus =

Genus of spiders

Scelidocteus is a genus of African palp-footed spiders that was first described by Eugène Louis Simon in 1907.

== Species ==
As of June 2019 it contains seven species, found only in Africa:

- Scelidocteus baccatus Simon, 1907 – São Tomé and Príncipe
- Scelidocteus berlandi Lessert, 1930 – Congo
- Scelidocteus lamottei Jézéquel, 1964 – Ivory Coast
- Scelidocteus ochreatus Simon, 1907 – Guinea-Bissau
- Scelidocteus pachypus Simon, 1907 (type) – West Africa
- Scelidocteus schoutedeni Benoit, 1974 – Congo
- Scelidocteus vuattouxi Jézéquel, 1964 – Ivory Coast
