= Chedima =

Scientific classification
- Kingdom: Animalia
- Phylum: Arthropoda
- Subphylum: Chelicerata
- Class: Arachnida
- Order: Araneae
- Infraorder: Araneomorphae
- Family: Palpimanidae
- Genus: Chedima; Simon, 1873
- Species: C. purpurea

Binomial name
- Chedima purpurea Simon, 1873

Genus of spiders

Chedima is a monotypic genus of Moroccan palp-footed spiders containing the single species, Chedima purpurea. It was first described by Eugène Louis Simon in 1873, and is only found in Morocco.
