= Notiothops =

Scientific classification
- Kingdom: Animalia
- Phylum: Arthropoda
- Subphylum: Chelicerata
- Class: Arachnida
- Order: Araneae
- Infraorder: Araneomorphae
- Family: Palpimanidae
- Genus: Notiothops; Platnick, Grismado & Ramírez, 1999

Type species
- N. noxiosus Platnick, Grismado & Ramírez, 1999

Species
- 8, see text

Genus of spiders

Notiothops is a genus of Chilean palp-footed spiders that was first described by Norman I. Platnick, C. J. Grismado & M. J. Ramírez in 1999.

== Species ==
As of June 2019 it contains eight species, found only in Chile:

- Notiothops birabeni (Zapfe, 1961) – Chile
- Notiothops campana Platnick, Grismado & Ramírez, 1999 – Chile
- Notiothops cekalovici Platnick, Grismado & Ramírez, 1999 – Chile
- Notiothops huaquen Platnick, Grismado & Ramírez, 1999 – Chile
- Notiothops llolleo Platnick, Grismado & Ramírez, 1999 – Chile
- Notiothops maulensis (Platnick, 1985) – Chile
- Notiothops noxiosus Platnick, Grismado & Ramírez, 1999 (type) – Chile
- Notiothops penai Platnick, Grismado & Ramírez, 1999 – Chile
