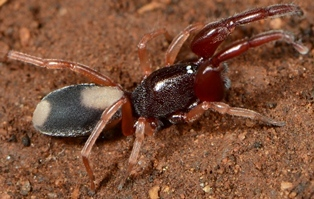
- Female Diaphorocellus biplagiatus
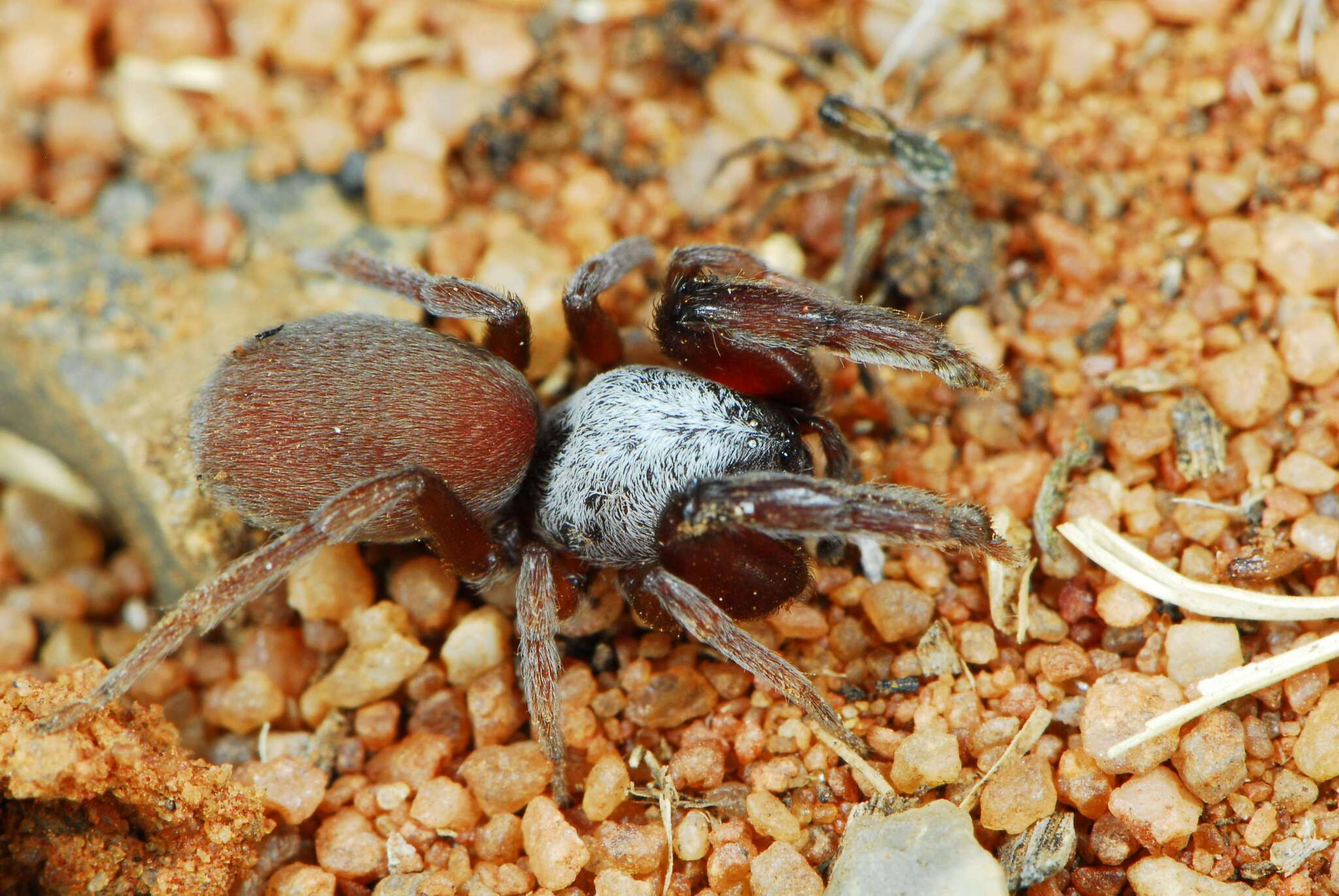
- Female Palpimanus paroculus

Scientific classification
- Kingdom: Animalia
- Phylum: Arthropoda
- Subphylum: Chelicerata
- Class: Arachnida
- Order: Araneae
- Infraorder: Araneomorphae
- Superfamily: Palpimanoidea
- Family: Palpimanidae; Thorell, 1870

Diversity
- 20 genera, 182 species
- blue: reported countries (WSC) green: observation hotspots (iNaturalist)

Synonyms
- Otiothopidae

= Palpimanidae =

Palp-footed spiders Temporal range: Aptian–present

Family of spiders

Palpimanidae, also known as palp-footed spiders, is a family of araneomorph spiders first described by Tamerlan Thorell in 1890. They are widely distributed throughout the tropical and subtropical regions of the world, the Mediterranean and one in Uzbekistan, but not Australia. They are not common and there is a high degree of endemism.

== Description ==
Anisaedus levii

The most obvious features of the Palpimanidae are the front legs, which are disproportionately powerful and heavily sclerotised. The abdomen is round to oval, evenly sprinkled with short straight hairs that in some species are sufficiently dense to form a close-fitting coat, though most species look nearly smooth.

Usually the cephalothorax is somewhat less obviously hairy. The abdomen is evenly rounded without conspicuous sculpting, and in many species is elongated into an olive shape twice as long as the cephalothorax, giving the spider a vaguely torpedo-shaped appearance.

Instead of having six spinnerets like most spiders, the Palpimanidae have only two.

Colour patterns generally are subdued and simple. A few genera, such as Diaphorocellus have light patches on a dark abdomen. Most others are brownish or reddish to dark in general colour, but as a rule the cephalothorax is more heavily sclerotised and darker than the abdomen, as well as glossier.

There are eight eyes in two rows of four, but in some species the outer anterior and posterior eyes are close together, which has caused some people to think there are just six eyes. In some species the chelicerae have stimulatory organs, microscopic ridges, with pegs that scrape over them when they rub the chelicerae together. The probable function is to signal to each other in mating, though it might have some defensive role as well.

== Biology ==
The behaviour of the Palpimanidae is in general poorly investigated. All species produce ecribellate silk. They certainly are ground dwellers and do not spin webs, though they many do spin shelters for themselves in holes or under rocks. Palpimanus gibbulus at least, lives in leaf litter or under stones in dry soils. Many or most species go wandering at night, either hunting or seeking mates.

They generally keep their very strong first legs held up in front of themselves while walking slowly at night, and on encountering possible prey they may feel it gently before grabbing it very rapidly and powerfully, as shown in some on-line video material.

== Genera ==
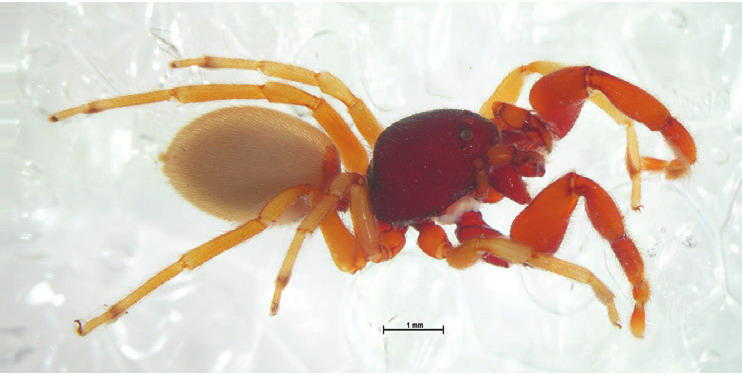
Male Sarascelis chaperi

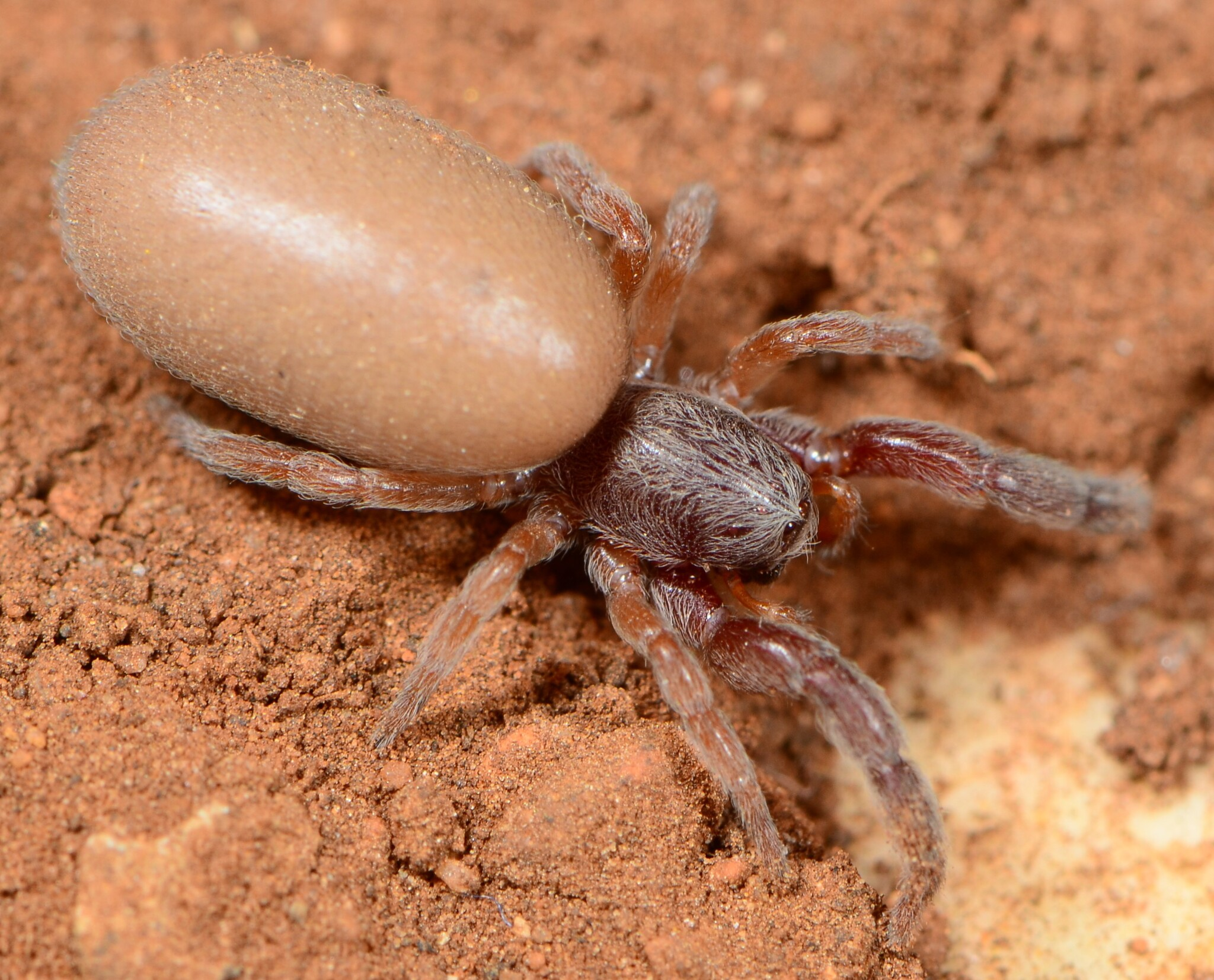
Juvenile Palpimanus transvaalicus

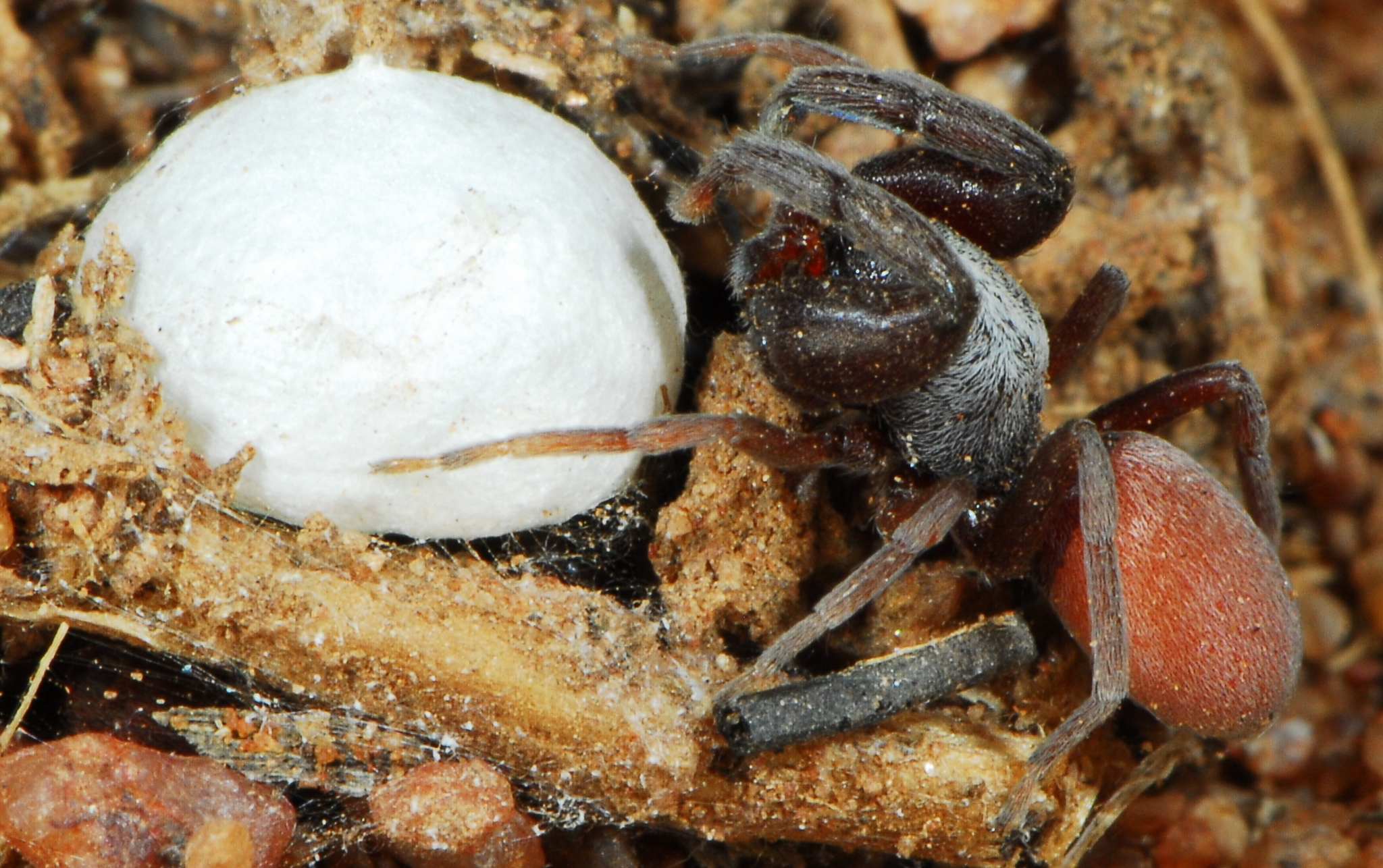
Palpimanus paroculus with egg sac

As of September 2025, this family includes twenty genera and 182 species:

- Anisaedus Simon, 1893 – Africa, South America
- Badia Roewer, 1961 – Senegal
- Boagrius Simon, 1893 – Asia
- Chedima Simon, 1873 – Morocco
- Chedimanops Zonstein & Marusik, 2017 – Congo
- Diaphorocellus Simon, 1893 – Southern Africa, Madagascar
- Fernandezina Birabén, 1951 – South America
- Hybosida Simon, 1898 – Seychelles
- Hybosidella Zonstein & Marusik, 2017 – Cameroon
- Ikuma Lawrence, 1938 – Namibia
- Levymanus Zonstein & Marusik, 2013 – Ethiopia to Iran
- Notiothops Platnick, Grismado & Ramírez, 1999 – Chile
- Otiothops MacLeay, 1839 – Central, South America
- Palpimanus Dufour, 1820 – Albania to India, Africa, Argentina
- Sarascelis Simon, 1887 – Africa, India
- Scelidocteus Simon, 1907 – Africa
- Scelidomachus Pocock, 1899 – Yemen (Socotra)
- Sitamacho Wood, Kulkarni, Ramírez & Scharff, 2024 – Kenya, Tanzania
- Steriphopus Simon, 1887 – India, Myanmar, Seychelles, Sri Lanka
- Tibetima Lin & Li, 2020 – China

=== Fossil genera ===
- Cretapalpus Downen & Selden, 2021, Crato Formation, Brazil, Early Cretaceous (Aptian)
