= List of critically endangered arthropods =

- Extinct in the wild (EW): 2 species
- Critically endangered (CR): 850 species
- Endangered (EN): 1,531 species
- Vulnerable (VU): 1,574 species
- Near threatened (NT, LR/cd): 1,118 species
- Least concern (LC): 8,632 species
- Data deficient (DD): 4,643 species
Arthropod species (IUCN, 2025-2)
- 18431 extant species have been evaluated
- 13788 of those are fully assessed (Note: excludes data deficient evaluations.)
- 9750 are not threatened at present
- 4223 to 8866 are threatened (Note: Threatened comprises CR, EN and VU. Upper estimate additionally includes DD.)
- 83 to 261 are extinct or extinct in the wild:
  - 81 extinct (EX) species (Note: Chart omits extinct (EX) species)
  - 2 extinct in the wild (EW)
  - 171 possibly extinct [CR(PE)]
  - 1 possibly extinct in the wild [CR(PEW)]

Critically endangered (CR) species face an extremely high risk of extinction in the wild.

As of July 2016, the International Union for Conservation of Nature (IUCN) listed 394 critically endangered arthropod species, including 86 which are tagged as possibly extinct. 4.1% of all evaluated arthropod species are listed as critically endangered. The IUCN also lists three arthropod subspecies as critically endangered.

No subpopulations of arthropods have been evaluated by the IUCN.

Additionally 2875 arthropod species (30% of those evaluated) are listed as data deficient, meaning there is insufficient information for a full assessment of conservation status. As these species typically have small distributions and/or populations, they are intrinsically likely to be threatened, according to the IUCN. While the category of data deficient indicates that no assessment of extinction risk has been made for the taxa, the IUCN notes that it may be appropriate to give them "the same degree of attention as threatened taxa, at least until their status can be assessed".

This is a complete list of critically endangered arthropod species and subspecies as evaluated by the IUCN. Species considered possibly extinct by the IUCN are marked as such.

== Centipedes ==
- Ityphilus melanostigmus
- Mecistocephalus cyclops (possibly extinct)
- Mecistocephalus sechellarum (possibly extinct)

== Seed shrimps ==
- Kapcypridopsis barnardi
- Namibcypris costata
- Spelaeoecia bermudensis

== Arachnids ==
There are 47 arachnid species assessed as critically endangered.

=== Harvestmen ===
- Seychelles blind harvestman (Benoitinus elegans)
- Biantes parvulus (possibly extinct)
- Holozoster ovalis (possibly extinct)
- Ibalonius lomani (possibly extinct)
- Mitraceras crassipalpum (possibly extinct)
- Sitalcicus incertus (possibly extinct)

=== Spiders ===
- Anapistula ataecina
- Andasta siltte
- Apolania segmentata
- Ariadna ustulata
- Conothele truncicola
- Euso muehlenbergi (possibly extinct)
- Farqua quadrimaculata
- Gamasomorpha austera (possibly extinct)
- Hasarius mahensis
- Desertas wolf spider (Hogna ingens)
- Hybosida dauban
- Hybosida lucida
- Idioctis intertidalis (possibly extinct)
- Ischnothyrella jivani
- Lionneta gerlachi
- Kanthan cave trapdoor spider (Liphistius kanthan)
- Microdrassus inaudax
- Moneta coercervea (possibly extinct)
- Nesiergus gardineri (possibly extinct)
- Nesiergus halophilus (possibly extinct)
- Horrid ground-weaver (Nothophantes horridus)
- Opopaea probosciella
- Opopaea suspecta
- Orchestina maureen
- Paccius quadridentatus (possibly extinct)
- Napoleon jumping spider (Paraheliophanus napoleon)
- Patu silho
- Rameshwaram ornamental (Poecilotheria hanumavilasumica)
- Peacock tarantula (Poecilotheria metallica)
- Prodida stella
- Sesato setosa
- Seychellia lodoiceae (possibly extinct)
- Spermophorides lascars
- Steriphopus lacertosus (possibly extinct)
- Voraptus tenellus (possibly extinct)
- Zoma zoma

=== Other arachnid species ===
- Afrogarypus seychellesensis (possibly extinct)
- Silhouette giant mite (Dicrogonatus niger)
- Seychelles forest scorpion (Lychas braueri)
- Mahezomus apicoporus
- Saaristo's giant mite (Michaelothyrus seychellensis)

== Branchiopoda ==
- Branchinecta belki
- Branchinecta mexicana
- Stone mountain fairy shrimp (Branchinella lithaca)
- Streptocephalus gracilis
- Streptocephalus moorei

== Millipedes ==
- Diglossosternoides curiosus (possibly extinct)
- Major black millipede (Doratogonus major)
- Eostemmiulus caecus
- Eucarlia mauriesi
- Rhinotus albifrons (possibly extinct)
- Sechelleptus unilineatus
- Spirobolellus simplex (possibly extinct)

== Entognatha ==
- Ceratophysella sp. nov. 'HC' (possibly extinct)
- Delamarephorura tami (possibly extinct)

== Maxillopoda ==
Includes barnacles, copepods and a number of related animals.

- Antrisocopia prehensilis
- Erebonectes nesioticus
- Nanocopia minuta
- Paracyclopia naessi
- Speleoithona bermudensis
- Speleophria bivexilla
- Speleophria scottodicarloi

== Malacostracans ==
Malacostraca includes crabs, lobsters, crayfish, shrimp, krill, woodlice, and many others. There are 125 malacostracan species and one malacostracan subspecies assessed as critically endangered.

=== Mysida ===
- Bermudamysis speluncola
- Sterrer's cave mysid (Platyops sterreri)

=== Mictaceans ===
- Mictocaris halope

=== Isopods ===
- Atlantasellus cavernicolus
- Bermudalana aruboides
- Curassanthura bermudensis
- Spiky yellow woodlouse (Pseudolaureola atlantica)
- Thermosphaeroma cavicauda
- Thermosphaeroma dugesi
- Thermosphaeroma macrura
- Thermosphaeroma smithi

=== Amphipods ===
- Aquadulcaris pheronyx
- Dandenong freshwater amphipod (Austrogammarus australis)
- Bogidiella bermudensis
- Cocoharpinia iliffei
- Noel's amphipod (Gammarus desperatus)
- Idunella sketi
- Ingolfiella longipes
- Pseudoniphargus grandimanus

=== Decapods ===
There are 106 decapod species and one decapod subspecies assessed as critically endangered.

==== Parastacids ====
- Cherax leckii
- Hairy marron (Cherax tenuimanus)
- Central north burrowing crayfish (Engaeus granulatus)
- Mallacoota burrowing crayfish (Engaeus mallacoota)
- Scottsdale burrowing crayfish (Engaeus spinicaudatus)
- Warragul burrowing crayfish (Engaeus sternalis)
- Margaret river burrowing crayfish (Engaewa pseudoreducta)
- Euastacus bindal
- Euastacus dalagarbe
- Fitzroy falls crayfish (Euastacus dharawalus)
- Euastacus eungella
- Euastacus gamilaroi
- Euastacus girurmulayn
- Euastacus guruhgi
- Euastacus guwinus
- Euastacus jagabar
- Euastacus jagara
- Euastacus maidae
- Ochre-bellied crayfish (Euastacus mirangudjin)
- Euastacus monteithorum
- Euastacus robertsi
- Euastacus setosus
- Euastacus yigara
- Ombrastacoides denisoni
- Ombrastacoides parvicaudatus

==== Gecarcinucids ====
- Ceylonthelphusa callista
- Ceylonthelphusa durrelli
- Ceylonthelphusa kotagama
- Ceylonthelphusa nana
- Ceylonthelphusa nata
- Ceylonthelphusa orthos
- Ceylonthelphusa sanguinea
- Ceylonthelphusa savitriae
- Clinothelphusa kakoota
- Mahatha helaya
- Mahatha iora
- Mahatha lacuna
- Mahatha regina
- Oziotelphusa intuta
- Oziotelphusa kodagoda
- Swamp forest crab (Parathelphusa reticulata)
- Perbrinckia cracens
- Perbrinckia enodis
- Perbrinckia fido
- Perbrinckia gabadagei (possibly extinct)
- Perbrinckia glabra
- Perbrinckia morayensis
- Perbrinckia punctata
- Perbrinckia quadratus
- Perbrinckia rosae
- Perbrinckia scitula
- Phricotelphusa hockpingi

==== Atyids ====
- Atya brachyrhinus (possibly extinct)
- Caridina apodosis (possibly extinct)
- Caridina linduensis
- Caridina subventralis
- Caridina tumida
- Caridina yilong (possibly extinct)
- Edoneus atheatus
- Lancaris kumariae
- Paratya norfolkensis
- Sinodina acutipoda (possibly extinct)
- Typhlatya iliffei

==== Cambarids ====
Species

- Cambarellus areolatus (possibly extinct)
- Cambarellus prolixus
- Benton County cave crayfish (Cambarus aculabrum)
- Lacon exit cave crayfish (Cambarus laconensis)
- Obey crayfish (Cambarus obeyensis)
- Delaware County cave crayfish (Cambarus subterraneus)
- Oklahoma cave crayfish (Cambarus tartarus)
- White spring cave crayfish (Cambarus veitchorum) (possibly extinct)
- Hell creek cave crayfish (Cambarus zophonastes)
- Hatchie burrowing crayfish (Fallicambarus hortoni)
- Shelta cave crayfish (Orconectes sheltae)
- Silver Glen springs cave crayfish (Procambarus attiguus)
- Procambarus catemacoensis
- Big-cheeked cave crayfish (Procambarus delicatus) (possibly extinct)
- Caddo chimney crayfish (Procambarus machardyi)
- Putnam County cave crayfish (Procambarus morrisi)
- Procambarus ortmannii
- Procambarus paradoxus (possibly extinct)
- Procambarus regiomontanus

Subspecies

- Procambarus rogersi expletus

==== Palaemonids ====
- Cryphiops brasiliensis
- Cryphiops luscus (possibly extinct)
- Leptopalaemon glabrus
- Macrobrachium denticulatum (possibly extinct)
- Macrobrachium oxyphilus (possibly extinct)
- Macrobrachium purpureamanus (possibly extinct)
- Macrobrachium scorteccii (possibly extinct)
- Florida cave shrimp (Palaemonetes cummingi) (possibly extinct)
- Palaemonetes lindsayi
- Palaemonetes mesopotamicus
- Palaemonetes mexicanus

==== Other decapod species ====
- Barbouria cubensis
- Orchid Island crab (Geothelphusa lanyu)
- Green crab (Geothelphusa lutao)
- Singapore freshwater crab (Johora singaporensis)
- Karstama balicum
- Karstama emdi
- Grandbassa river crab (Liberonautes grandbassa)
- Lugbe river crab (Liberonautes lugbe)
- Placid crayfish (Pacifastacus fortis)
- Procaris chacei
- Somersiella sterreri
- Strengeriana antioquensis (possibly extinct)
- Tehuana veracruzana (possibly extinct)

== Insects ==
There are 195 insect species and two insect subspecies assessed as critically endangered.

=== Blattodea ===
- Balta crassivenosa (possibly extinct)
- Desroches cockroach (Delosia ornata)
- Holocompsa pusilla (possibly extinct)
- Hololeptoblatta pandanicola
- Sliferia similis (possibly extinct)
- Theganopteryx grisea (possibly extinct)
- Theganopteryx liturata (possibly extinct)
- Theganopteryx scotti (possibly extinct)

=== Orthoptera ===
There are 72 species in the order Orthoptera assessed as critically endangered.

==== Euschmidtiids ====
- Morogoro monkey grasshopper (Chromomastax movogovodia) (possibly extinct)
- Mlingano monkey grasshopper (Euschmidtia bidens) (possibly extinct)
- Burtt's monkey grasshopper (Euschmidtia burtti) (possibly extinct)
- Dirsh's monkey grasshopper (Euschmidtia dirshi) (possibly extinct)
- Phipps' monkey grasshopper (Euschmidtia phippsi) (possibly extinct)
- Usambara monkey grasshopper (Euschmidtia uvarovi)
- Dar-es-salaam monkey grasshopper (Euschmidtia viridifasciata) (possibly extinct)

==== Crickets ====
- Gryllapterus tomentosus
- Metioche payendeei
- Metioche superbus
- Mahé boulder cricket (Phalangacris alluaudi)
- Seychellesia nitidula

==== Acridids ====
- Zanzibar giant forest grasshopper (Allaga ambigua) (possibly extinct)
- Usambara splendid grasshopper (Anischnansis burtti) (possibly extinct)
- Uluguru forest grasshopper (Burttia sylvatica)
- Adana grasshopper (Chorthippus antecessor)
- Bozdagh grasshopper (Chorthippus bozdaghi)
- Ilgaz mountain grasshopper (Chorthippus ilkazi)
- Epirus dancing grasshopper (Chorthippus lacustris)
- Uluguru mountain grasshopper (Cyphocerastis uluguruensis)
- Maspalomas bow-legged grasshopper (Dericorys minutus) (possibly extinct)
- Kilosa noble grasshopper (Eupropacris abbreviata) (possibly extinct)
- Gastrimargus immaculatus
- Myrmeleotettix ethicus
- Triandafilia mountain grasshopper (Oropodisma lagrecai)
- Willemse's mountain grasshopper (Oropodisma willemsei)
- East Usambara speckled grasshopper (Physocrobylus tessa)
- Schayera baiulus

==== Tettigoniids ====
- Mount Coke false shieldback (Acilacris furcatus)
- Kristin's false shieldback (Acilacris kristinae)
- Santa Monica shieldback katydid (Aglaothorax longipennis)
- Black-spotted false shieldback (Aroegas nigroornatus)
- Pondo flat-necked shieldback (Arytropteris pondo)
- Fer's marbled bush-cricket (Eupholidoptera feri)
- Gran Canaria bush-cricket (Evergoderes cabrerai) (possibly extinct)
- Hemisaga elongata
- Middlekauf's shieldback katydid (Idiostatus middlekaufi)
- Ixalodectes flectocercus
- Nanodectes bulbicercus
- Pachysaga strobila
- Imperiled grass false shieldback (Paracilacris periclitatus)
- Paradecolya briseferi
- Giona Greek bush-cricket (Parnassiana gionica)
- Menalon Greek bush-cricket (Parnassiana menalon)
- Akarnanika Greek bush-cricket (Parnassiana nigromarginata)
- Panaitoliko Greek bush-cricket (Parnassiana panaetolikon)
- Parnassos Greek bush-cricket (Parnassiana parnassica)
- Zulu ambush katydid (Peringueyella zulu) (possibly extinct)
- Cyprian grey bush-cricket (Platycleis kibris)
- Calbali bush-cricket (Psorodonotus ebneri)
- Three-lobed bush-cricket (Rhacocleis trilobata) (possibly extinct)
- Rodriguesiophisis spinifera
- Sardinian grey bush-cricket (Sardoplatycleis galvagnii)
- Arboreal seedpod shieldback (Thoracistus arboreus)
- Peringuey's seedpod shieldback (Thoracistus peringueyi) (possibly extinct)
- Transkei shieldback (Transkeidectes multidentis)

==== Other Orthoptera species ====
- Morogoro pretty grasshopper (Acanthothericles bicoloripes) (possibly extinct)
- Palma stick grasshopper (Acrostira euphorbiae)
- Tenerife stick grasshopper (Acrostira tenerifae)
- Arachnocephalus medvedevi
- Castleton's flightless katydid (Austrodontura castletoni)
- Cave katydid (Cedarbergeniana imperfecta)
- Mpwapwa silent grasshopper (Chromousambilla burtti) (possibly extinct)
- Seychelles crested groundhopper (Coptottigia cristata)
- Duplessis' agile katydid (Griffiniana duplessisae)
- Crau plain grasshopper (Prionotropis rhodanica)
- Seychelles shortwinged groundhopper (Procytettix fusiformis) (possibly extinct)
- Marais' lace-winged katydid (Pseudosaga maraisi)
- Pyrgacris descampsi
- Pyrgacris relictus
- Torreya pygmy grasshopper (Tettigidea empedonepia)
- San Torini cave-cricket (Troglophilus marinae)

=== Hymenoptera ===
- Adetomyrma venatrix
- Ammobates dusmeti
- Andrena labiatula (possibly extinct)
- Sri Lankan relict ant (Aneuretus simoni)
- Rusty patched bumble bee (Bombus affinis)
- Franklin's bumblebee (Bombus franklini)
- Bombus rubriventris (possibly extinct)
- Suckley cuckoo bumble bee (Bombus suckleyi)
- Variable cuckoo bumblebee (Bombus variabilis)
- Megachile cypricola (possibly extinct)
- Nomada siciliensis (possibly extinct)
- Australian ant (Nothomyrmecia macrops)

=== Lepidoptera ===
Moths and butterflies

- Marion's plume moth (Agdistis marionae)
- Sri Lankan rose (Atrophaneura jophon)
- Cotrell's daisy copper (Chrysoritis cotrelli)
- Prairie sphinx moth (Euproserpinus wiesti)
- Natterer's Longwing (Heliconius nattereri)
- Lepidochrysops lotana
- David's tiger (Parantica davidi)
- Pieris wollastoni (possibly extinct)
- Bolland's blue (Polyommatus bollandi)
- Macedonian grayling (Pseudochazara cingovskii)
- Sinai baton blue butterfly (Pseudophilotes sinaicus)

=== Beetles ===
- Coral pink sand dunes tiger beetle (Cicindela albissima)
- Colophon berrisfordi
- Colophon cassoni
- Colophon montisatris
- Colophon primosi
- Delta green ground beetle (Elaphrus viridis)
- Glaphyra bassettii
- Canterbury knobbled weevil (Hadramphus tuberculatus)
- Edith's fungus weevil (Homoeodera edithia)
- Click beetle-like fungus weevil (Homoeodera elateroides)
- Greater fungus weevil (Homoeodera major)
- Bark beetle-like fungus weevil (Homoeodera scolytoides)
- Hydrotarsus compunctus
- Meladema imbricata
- American burying beetle (Nicrophorus americanus)
- Cromwell chafer beetle (Prodontria lewisi)
- Propomacrus cypriacus
- Thorectes coloni

=== Odonata ===
Includes dragonflies and damselflies.

Species

- Acanthagrion taxaense
- Allocnemis maccleeryi
- Amanipodagrion gilliesi
- Anisogomphus solitaris (possibly extinct)
- Sydney hawk (Austrocordulia leonardi)
- Boninagrion ezoin
- Boninthemis insularis
- Togo red jewel (Chlorocypha jejuna) (possibly extinct)
- Coenagriocnemis insularis
- Cryptophaea saukra
- Disparoneura ramajana (possibly extinct)
- Drepanosticta adami (possibly extinct)
- Drepanosticta austeni (possibly extinct)
- Merry shadowdamsel (Drepanosticta hilaris)
- Drepanosticta montana (possibly extinct)
- Drepanosticta submontana (possibly extinct)
- Echo maxima
- Smoky-winged threadtail (Elattoneura leucostigma)
- Elattoneura pluotae
- Elga newtonsantosi
- Enallagma maldivensis (possibly extinct)
- Erythrodiplax acantha
- Erythrodiplax nivea
- Sri Lanka grappletail (Heliogomphus ceylonicus)
- Heliogomphus lyratus (possibly extinct)
- Heliogomphus nietneri (possibly extinct)
- Heteragrion peregrinum (possibly extinct)
- Indolestes boninensis
- Libellula angelina
- Macromia flinti (possibly extinct)
- Atlantic helicopter (Mecistogaster pronoti)
- Crimson Hawaiian damselfly (Megalagrion leptodemas)
- Molokai damselfly (Megalagrion molokaiense) (possibly extinct)
- Flying earwig Hawaiian damselfly (Megalagrion nesiotes)
- Metaleptobasis gibbosa (possibly extinct)
- Micrathyria kleerekoperi
- Micromacromia miraculosa
- Minagrion ribeiroi
- Bizarre junglewatcher (Neodythemis takamandensis)
- Nesolestes nigeriensis
- Onychogomphus boudoti
- Mulanje damsel (Oreocnemis phoenix)
- Elusive skimmer (Orthetrum rubens) (possibly extinct)
- Palaemnema croceicauda
- Palaemnema edmondi (possibly extinct)
- Gambles's relic (Pentaphlebia gamblesi)
- Perissolestes remus (possibly extinct)
- Kenya jewel (Platycypha amboniensis)
- Proischnura polychromatica
- Proplatycnemis pembipes
- Protosticta gracilis
- Protosticta plicata
- Protosticta rozendalorum
- Pseudagrion mascagnii
- Greek red damsel (Pyrrhosoma elisabethae)
- Rhinocypha ogasawarensis
- Risiocnemis seidenschwarzi
- Emerald Sri Lanka spreadwing (Sinhalestes orientalis)
- Sympetrum evanescens
- Principe dropwing (Trithemis nigra)
- Streamertail (Zygonychidium gracile)

Subspecies

- Chlorogomphus brunneus keramensis
- Delphi cordulegaster (Cordulegaster helladica kastalia)

=== Other insect species ===
- Vesk's plant-louse (Acizzia veski)
- Spined dwarf mantis (Ameles fasciipennis) (possibly extinct)
- Antisolabis seychellensis
- Scott's stick insect (Carausius scotti)
- Chaetolabia fryeri
- Chaetospania gardineri
- Lord Howe Island stick insect (Dryococelus australis)
- Glyptotermes scotti
- Pygmy hog-sucking louse (Haematopinus oliveri)
- Procryptotermes fryeri
- Banksia montana mealybug (Pseudococcus markharveyi)
- Mount Donna Buang wingless stonefly (Riekoperla darlingtoni)
- Barrett's plant-louse (Trioza barrettae)

== See also ==
- Lists of IUCN Red List critically endangered species
- List of least concern arthropods
- List of near threatened arthropods
- List of vulnerable arthropods
- List of endangered arthropods
- List of recently extinct arthropods
- List of data deficient arthropods
