= List of freshwater crabs of Sri Lanka =

Sri Lanka is an island close to the southern end of India with a tropical environment. The invertebrate fauna is as large as it is common to other regions of the world. There are about two million species of arthropods found in the world, and still it is counting with many new species still being discovered. It is very complicated and difficult to summarize the exact number of species found within a certain region.

The following list provide the freshwater crabs of Sri Lanka.

== Freshwater crabs ==
Phylum: Arthropoda
Subphylum: Crustacea
Class: Malacostraca
Order: Decapoda

Sri Lanka's freshwater crab fauna is extremely important to the island, due to its endemism. All recorded 51 species, along with five genera, are totally endemic to Sri Lanka. 98% of those crabs are IUCN categorized as threatened, endangered or critically endangered animals due to habitat declining, capturing for food, illegal collecting and exotic species.

== Family: Gecarcinucidae ==
- Ceylonthelphusa alpina
- Ceylonthelphusa armata
- Ceylonthelphusa callista
- Ceylonthelphusa cavatrix
- Ceylonthelphusa diva
- Ceylonthelphusa durrelli
- Ceylonthelphusa kandambyi
- Ceylonthelphusa kotagama
- Ceylonthelphusa nata
- Ceylonthelphusa orthos
- Ceylonthelphusa rugosa
- Ceylonthelphusa savitriae
- Ceylonthelphusa sentosa
- Ceylonthelphusa sanguinea
- Ceylonthelphusa soror
- Ceylonthelphusa venusta
- Clinothelphusa kakoota
- Mahatha adonis
- Mahatha helaya
- Mahatha iora
- Mahatha lacuna
- Mahatha ornatipes
- Mahatha regina
- Oziotelphusa ceylonensis
- Oziotelphusa dakuna
- Oziotelphusa gallicola
- Oziotelphusa hippocastanum
- Oziotelphusa intuta
- Oziotelphusa kodagoda
- Oziotelphusa mineriyaensis
- Oziotelphusa populosa
- Oziotelphusa ritigala
- Oziotelphusa stricta
- Pastilla dacuna
- Perbrinckia fenestra
- Perbrinckia cracens
- Perbrinckia enodis
- Perbrinckia fido
- Perbrinckia gabadagei
- Perbrinckia glabra
- Perbrinckia integra
- Perbrinckia morayensis
- Perbrinckia punctata
- Perbrinckia quadratus
- Perbrinckia rosae
- Perbrinckia scansor - only tree climbing crab in Sri Lanka.
- Perbrinckia scitula
- Perbrinckia uva
- Spiralothelphusa fernandoi
- Spiralothelphusa parvula

== Bibliography ==
- Beenaerts, Natalie; Pethiyagoda, Rohan; Ng, Peter K. L.; Yeo, Darren C. J.; Bex, Geert Jan; Bahir, Mohomed M.; Artois, Tom (2010). "Phylogenetic diversity of Sri Lankan freshwater crabs and its implications for conservation". Molecular Ecology. 19 (1): 183–96. doi:10.1111/j.1365-294X.2009.04439.x. PMID 19943890. S2CID 20968976.
