= List of Nature Conservation Act endangered fauna of Queensland =

This is a list of animals listed as Endangered under the terms of Queensland's Nature Conservation Act 1992. The list is based on the most recent regulations, the Nature Conservation (Animals) Regulation 2020.

== Invertebrates ==
- Adclarkia dawsonensis (boggomoss snail)
- Adclarkia dulacca (Dulacca woodland snail)
- Argynnis hyperbius inconstans (Australian fritillary butterfly)
- Euastacus eungella (Eungella spiny crayfish)
- Euastacus hystricosus (Conondale spiny crayfish)
- Euastacus monteithorum (Monteith’s spiny crayfish)
- Euastacus robertsi (Robert’s crayfish)
- Euastacus suttoni (Sutton’s crayfish)
- Tenuibranchiurus glypticus (swamp crayfish)
- Trisyntopa scatophaga (antbed moth)

== Fish ==
- Carcharias taurus (greynurse shark)
- Chlamydogobius micropterus (Elizabeth Springs goby)
- Chlamydogobius squamigenus (Edgbaston goby)
- Hippocampus whitei (White’s seahorse)
- Mordacia praecox (non-parasitic lamprey)
- Nannoperca oxleyana (Oxleyan pygmy perch)
- Pseudomugil mellis (honey blue eye)
- Scaturiginichthys vermeilipinnis (redfin blue eye)

== Amphibians ==
- Cophixalus aenigma (tapping nursery frog)
- Litoria nannotis (torrent treefrog)
- Litoria rheocola (common mist frog)
- Mixophyes fleayi (Fleay’s barred frog)
- Philoria knowlesi (Mount Ballow mountain frog)
- Philoria kundagungan (red-and-yellow mountain frog)
- Taudactylus eungellensis (Eungella tinkerfrog)

== Reptiles ==
- Anomalopus mackayi (long-legged worm skink)
- Caretta caretta (loggerhead turtle)
- Concinnia frerei (Bartle Frere bar-sided skink)
- Dermochelys coriacea (leatherback turtle)
- Elusor macrurus (Mary River turtle)
- Eretmochelys imbricata (hawksbill turtle)
- Hemiaspis damelii (grey snake)
- Karma tryoni (Tryon’s skink)
- Lepidochelys olivacea (olive ridley turtle
- Lerista allanae (retro slider)
- Lerista colliveri (nubbined fine-lined slider)
- Lerista rochfordensis (Rochford slider)
- Lerista vittata (Mount Cooper slider)
- Phyllurus caudiannulatus (ringed thin-tailed gecko)
- Rheodytes leukops (Fitzroy River turtle)
- Tympanocryptis condaminensis (Condamine earless dragon)
- Tympanocryptis wilsoni (Roma earless dragon)
- Varanus mertensi (Mertens’ water monitor)
- Wollumbinia belli (Bell’s turtle)

== Birds ==
- Amytornis barbatus barbatus (grey grasswren (Bulloo))
- Amytornis dorotheae (Carpentarian grasswren)
- Botaurus poiciloptilus (Australasian bittern)
- Calidris canutus (red knot)
- Casuarius casuarius johnsonii (southern cassowary (southern population))
- Charadrius mongolus (lesser sand plover)
- Chloebia gouldiae (Gouldian finch)
- Dasyornis brachypterus (eastern bristlebird)
- Epthianura crocea macgregori (yellow chat (Dawson))
- Erythrotriorchis radiatus (red goshawk)
- Lathamus discolor (swift parrot)
- Limosa lapponica menzbieri (Northern Siberian bar-tailed godwit)
- Lophochroa leadbeateri leadbeateri (Major Mitchell's cockatoo (eastern))
- Macronectes giganteus (southern giant-petrel)
- Melanodryas cucullata cucullata (hooded robin (south-eastern))
- Neochmia ruficauda ruficauda (star finch (eastern subspecies))
- Numenius madagascariensis (eastern curlew)
- Pezoporus occidentalis (night parrot)
- Poephila cincta cincta (black-throated finch (white-rumped subspecies))
- Probosciger aterrimus macgillivrayi (southern palm cockatoo)
- Psephotus chrysopterygius (golden-shouldered parrot)
- Rostratula australis (Australian painted snipe)
- Sternula nereis exsul (New Caledonian fairy tern)
- Thalassarche cauta (shy albatross)
- Thalassarche chrysostoma (grey-headed albatross)

== Mammals ==
- Antechinus argentus (silver-headed antechinus)
- Antechinus arktos (black-tailed antechinus)
- Bettongia tropica (northern bettong)
- Chalinolobus dwyeri (large-eared pied bat)
- Dasyuroides byrnei (kowari)
- Dasyurus maculatus gracilis (spotted-tailed quoll (northern subspecies))
- Dasyurus maculatus maculatus (spotted-tailed quoll (south-eastern mainland population))
- Hipposideros semoni (Semon’s leaf-nosed bat)
- Macroderma gigas (ghost bat)
- Macrotis lagotis (greater bilby)
- Notomys fuscus (dusky hopping-mouse)
- Onychogalea frenata (bridled nailtail wallaby)
- Petauroides volans (greater glider (southern and central populations))
- Petaurus australis unnamed subsp. (yellow-bellied glider (northern subspecies))
- Petaurus gracilis (mahogany glider)
- Petrogale persephone (Proserpine rock-wallaby)
- Phascolarctos cinereus (koala)
- Pseudomys oralis (Hastings River mouse)
- Pteropus conspicillatus (spectacled flying-fox)
- Rhinolophus philippinensis (greater large-eared horseshoe bat)
- Saccolaimus saccolaimus nudicluniatus (bare-rumped sheathtail bat)
- Sminthopsis douglasi (Julia Creek dunnart)
