= Euastacus yanga =

Variable spiny cray

Conservation status
- Least Concern (IUCN 3.1)

Scientific classification
- Kingdom: Animalia
- Phylum: Arthropoda
- Clade: Pancrustacea
- Class: Malacostraca
- Order: Decapoda
- Suborder: Pleocyemata
- Family: Parastacidae
- Genus: Euastacus
- Species: E. yanga

Binomial name
- Euastacus yanga Morgan, 1997
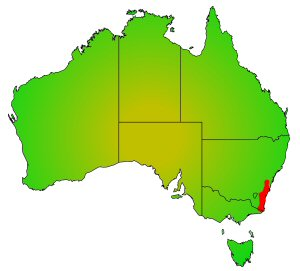
- Distribution map of Euastacus yanga

Australian freshwater crayfish

Euastacus yanga, also known as the variable spiny cray, is a freshwater crayfish endemic to south eastern Australia.

== Description ==
The maximum recorded size was 61.2 mm (2.41 in) OCL (Occipital Carapace Length) which is used to measure the species' size.

The rostrum is short and in individuals over 50 mm (2.0 in) OCL usually does not reach the base of the third antenna segment. In those measuring 20–140 mm (0.79–5.51 in) OCL the rostrum is to the base or midpoint of that segment and, in some under 20 mm (0.79 in), goes to the end of the third segment.

The cephalon is spiny on most organisms but less so on specimens under 20 mm (0.79 in) OCL. In southern populations the spines are larger and more numerous.

Their thorax has up to 20 spines on each side in one or two irregular rows although this is usually absent on smaller individuals (under 20 mm (0.79 in) OCL). The spines are generally longer and sharper in southern populations. The tubercles are moderately to densely distributed on specimens over 30 mm (1.2 in) OCL, very sparse to moderately on smaller examples, occasionally absent.

Their abdomen has one, or very occasionally, two, dorsal-lateral spines on somite 1 of individuals over 20 mm (0.79 in) OCL. Dorsal spine often present on somite 1, especially on larger specimens. Somite 2 has three to seven (very occasionally two) in lateral line 1, often absent on smaller specimens. Somites 3-5 of larger specimens, over 30 mm (1.2 in) OCL and most over 20 mm (0.79 in), have a single spine in line 1. One to three line 2 spines are usually found on somites 3–6. A single dorsal-lateral spine is usually found on somites 3-5 and occasionally somite 6.

There are typically 17 telsonic spines present in each specimen's tailfan. The inner branch of their uropod has zero to four median spines of variable size whereas the outer branch has zero to five marginal spines. The uropod and often the telsonic spines are absent in northern animals, becoming more numerous in the south.

Their chelae or moveable claws are variable in form, occasionally stout but often longer. Most specimens over 30 mm (1.2 in) OCL have well-developed teeth. The propodus (fixed part of claw) has a well developed row of ventrolateral spines often extending to the tip of the finger, except in small specimens under 20 mm (0.79 in) OCL.

=== Colouring ===
The body is a deep brown-green or red-brown to brown on the back and fades to paler on the belly. The back spines on the thorax are dark and may be black or vary in colour. Their tubercules are pale brown to orange or yellow. Their abdominal spines are yellow to pale orange though some larger specimens have a blue tinge. Their leg joints may be red or orange while the body of legs are generally dark brown, brown-green or blue-green. The fingers are deep blue-green, brown or orange and finger tips may be red in southern populations.

== Distribution ==
The variable spiny cray is found in New South Wales from the Robertson to Bundanoon area in the Southern Highlands south to just inside the Victorian border near Genoa. E. Yanga is the third most widely distributed Euastacus species behind E. armatus and E. spinifer.

== Habitat ==
The species has been collected in streams from 60–720 m (200–2,360 ft) AMSL. The surrounding streamside vegetation consisted mainly of temperate rainforest with dry sclerophyll along the ridge-lines but with dry sclerophyll extending to the stream bank in areas lacking rainforest. This species prefers smaller streams and has not been collected at any site together with other members of the genus.

== Lifecycle/Reproduction ==
Berried females (those that are carrying eggs) have been collected in late October through November. The eggs are burgundy with white patches where the developing embryo was located and each female carries 43 to 164.

== Conservation ==
The species is listed as endangered in Victoria otherwise least concern.

== Utility to humans ==
Variable spiny cray are unsuitable for human consumption due to their small size. They do not reach the minimum legal size in both Victoria and New South Wales of 90 mm (3.5 in) OCL.
