= Euastacus dalagarbe =

Conservation status
- Critically Endangered (IUCN 3.1)

Scientific classification
- Kingdom: Animalia
- Phylum: Arthropoda
- Clade: Pancrustacea
- Class: Malacostraca
- Order: Decapoda
- Suborder: Pleocyemata
- Family: Parastacidae
- Genus: Euastacus
- Species: E. dalagarbe

Binomial name
- Euastacus dalagarbe Coughran, 2005

Species of crustacean

Euastacus dalagarbe is a species of freshwater crayfish endemic to Australia that belongs to the family Parastacidae. It has a small range in New South Wales and is regarded by the International Union for Conservation of Nature as "critically endangered".

== Description ==
Euastacus dalagarbe is one of four new species of freshwater crayfish that were first described by Coughran in 2005 during surveys of the northeastern part of New South Wales. It is intermediate in morphology between Euastacus setosus and the more spiny members of the genus. The rostrum of the holotype was 36 mm (1.4 in) long. The dorsal surface of the body is greenish-brown, and the ventral surface and the abdomen brown. The chelae are greenish-blue dorsally and the walking limbs are pale tan, both being dull orange ventrally. There is a blue spine with a yellow tip immediately behind the eye.

== Ecology ==
Euastacus dalagarbe is often host to small flatworms in the order Temnocephalida.

=== Distribution and habitat ===
Euastacus dalagarbe is endemic to a small area in the Border Ranges National Park in New South Wales. It is known from a number of gullies and small, headwater streams in forests at altitudes of over 570 m (1,870 ft). The total area of occupancy is about 50 km^{2} (19 mi^{2}) and is fragmented into eight separate locations. It burrows under stones in the mud and clay to reach moist areas. It shares its range with the larger and much spinier Euastacus sulcatus which tends to be present in the larger creeks while E. dalagarbe occupies the smaller ones, many of which dry up in summer.

=== Conservation status ===
The species has very specific habitat requirements and is threatened by habitat loss. Forest fires or other natural disasters could significantly impact populations, and because of its fragmented range, it is particularly vulnerable to habitat loss, with little possibility of dispersing to new locations. Climate change may force it to higher elevations to find the cool waters it needs. Another cause for concern are the feral cats, foxes and domestic livestock that prey on it or pollute the waters where it lives. Cane toads, which have invaded its range, may also impact on populations, and for all these reasons, the International Union for Conservation of Nature has assessed its conservation status as "critically endangered".
