= Tibetima =

Scientific classification
- Kingdom: Animalia
- Phylum: Arthropoda
- Subphylum: Chelicerata
- Class: Arachnida
- Order: Araneae
- Infraorder: Araneomorphae
- Family: Palpimanidae
- Genus: Tibetima; Lin & Li, 2020

Type species
- T. char Lin & Li, 2020

Species
- Tibetima char Lin & Li, 2020; Tibetima gyirongensis (Hu & Li, 1987)

Genus of spiders

Tibetima is a small genus of east Asian palp-footed spiders. It was first described by Y. J. Lin and S. Q. Li in 2020, and it has only been found in China. As of March 2022 it contains only two species: T. char and T. gyirongensis.

== See also ==
- Fernandezina
- Steriphopus
