= Kapcypridopsis =

Scientific classification
- Domain: Eukaryota
- Kingdom: Animalia
- Phylum: Arthropoda
- Class: Ostracoda
- Order: Podocopida
- Family: Cyprididae
- Subfamily: Cypridopsinae
- Genus: Kapcypridopsis; McKenzie, 1977

Genus of seed shrimps

Kapcypridopsis is a genus of ostracod crustaceans in the family Cyprididae, subfamily Cypridopsinae. It includes the critically endangered species Kapcypridopsis barnardi.

== Literature ==
- McKenzie, K.G. 1977: Illustrated generic key to South African continental Ostracoda. Annals of the South African Museum, 74 (3) 45-103.
