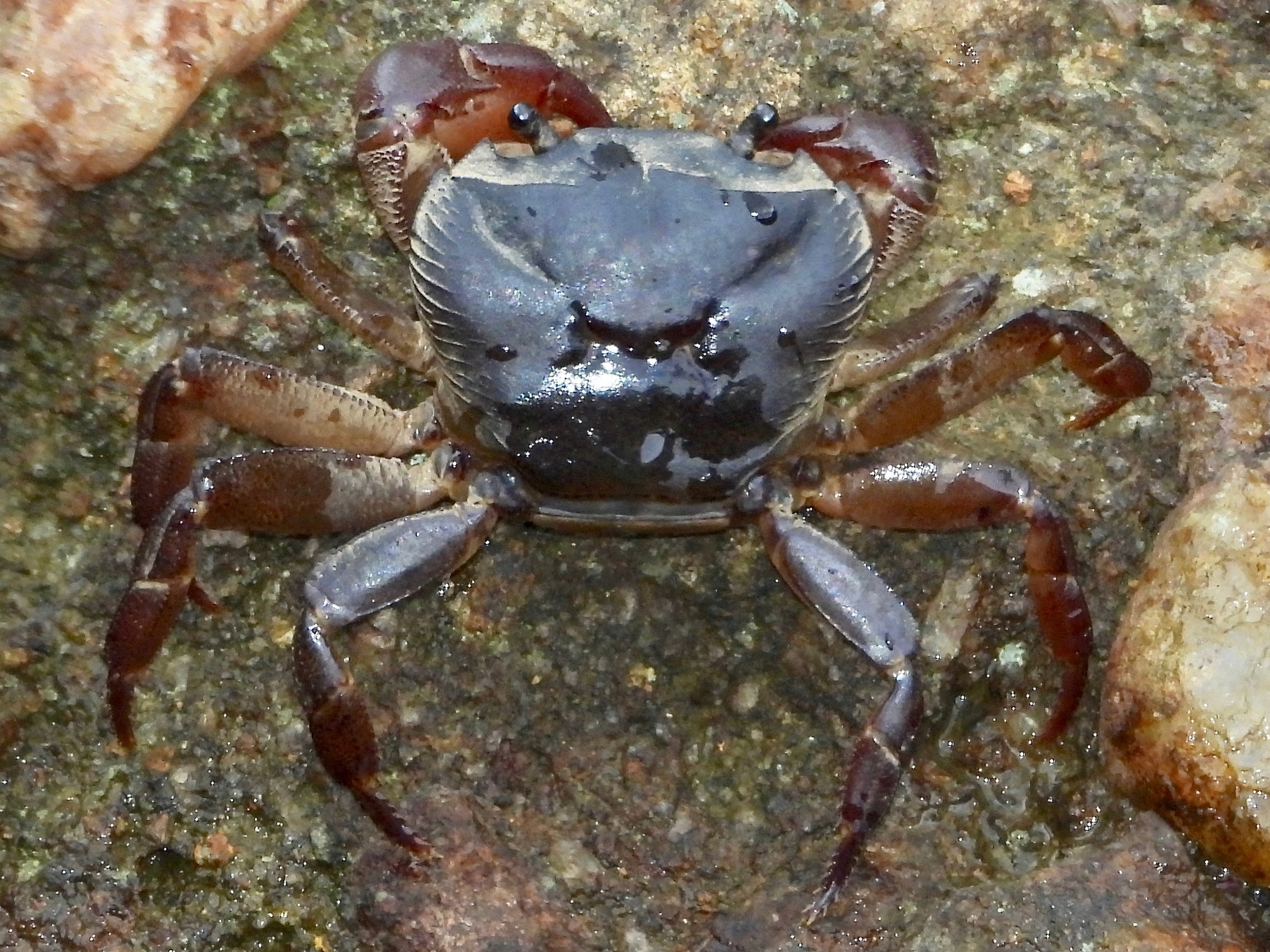
- Ceylonthelphusa rugosa

Scientific classification
- Kingdom: Animalia
- Phylum: Arthropoda
- Class: Malacostraca
- Order: Decapoda
- Suborder: Pleocyemata
- Infraorder: Brachyura
- Family: Gecarcinucidae
- Genus: Ceylonthelphusa; Bott, 1969

Type species
- Ceylonthelphusa rugosa Kingsley, 1880

= Ceylonthelphusa =

Genus of crabs

Ceylonthelphusa is a genus of freshwater crabs endemic to Sri Lanka, where they live in moist lowland forests, swamps and rivers. Many of the species are on the IUCN Red List of threatened species, with the greatest risk factor being habitat loss. Ceylonthelphusa contains these species:

- Ceylonthelphusa alpina Bahir & Ng, 2005
- Ceylonthelphusa armata (Ng, 1995)
- Ceylonthelphusa austrina (Alcock, 1909)
- Ceylonthelphusa callista (Ng, 1995)
- Ceylonthelphusa cavatrix (Bahir, 1998)
- Ceylonthelphusa diva Bahir & Ng, 2005
- Ceylonthelphusa durrelli Bahir & Ng, 2005
- Ceylonthelphusa kandambyi Bahir, 1999
- Ceylonthelphusa kotagama (Bahir, 1998)
- Ceylonthelphusa nana Bahir, 1999
- Ceylonthelphusa nata Ng & Tay, 2001
- Ceylonthelphusa orthos Ng & Tay, 2001
- Ceylonthelphusa rugosa (Kingsley, 1880)
- Ceylonthelphusa sanguinea (Ng, 1995)
- Ceylonthelphusa savitriae Bahir & Ng, 2005
- Ceylonthelphusa sentosa Bahir, 1999
- Ceylonthelphusa soror (Zehntner, 1894)
- Ceylonthelphusa venusta (Ng, 1995)
