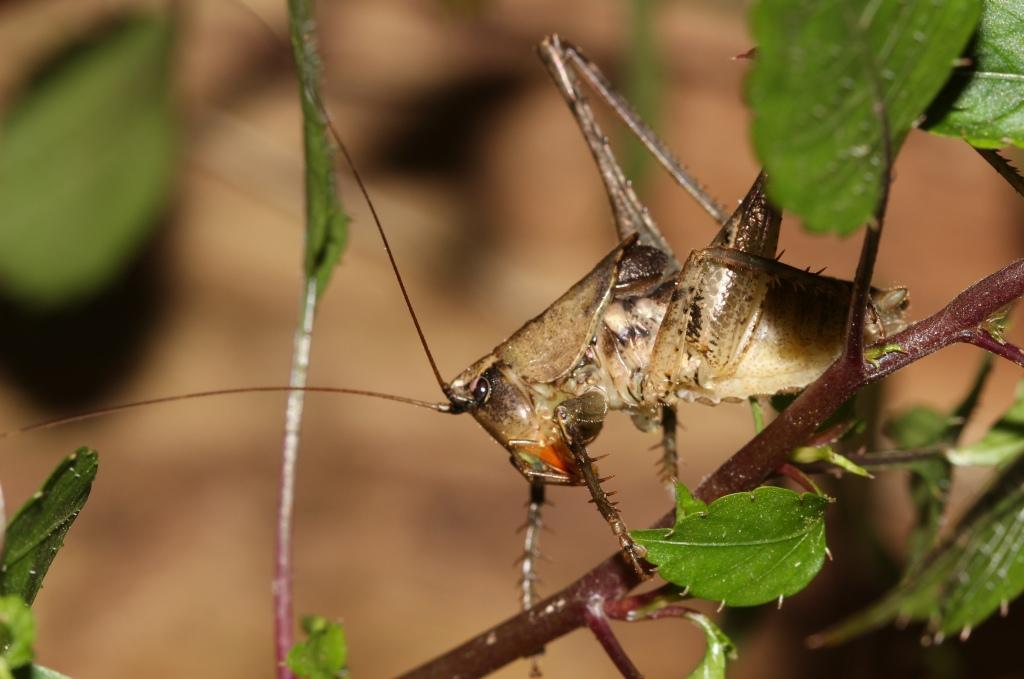
- Arytropteris granulithorax

Scientific classification
- Domain: Eukaryota
- Kingdom: Animalia
- Phylum: Arthropoda
- Class: Insecta
- Order: Orthoptera
- Suborder: Ensifera
- Family: Tettigoniidae
- Subfamily: Tettigoniinae
- Tribe: Arytropteridini
- Genus: Arytropteris; Herman, 1874

Species
- See text.

= Arytropteris =

Genus of cricket-like animals

Arytropteris is a genus of shield-backed katydids, containing the following species:

- Arytropteris basalis (Walker, 1869) – flat-necked shieldback
- Arytropteris granulithorax Péringuey, 1916 – east coast flat-necked shieldback
- Arytropteris pondo (Rentz, 1988) – Pondo flat-necked shieldback

== See also ==
- Thoracistus
