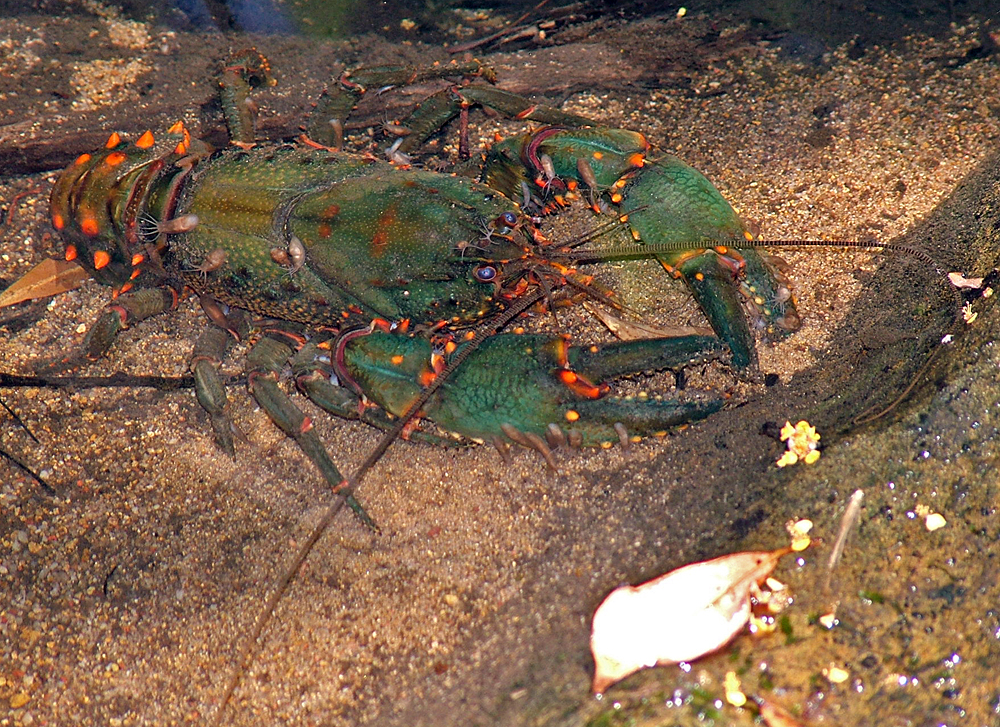
- Euastacus spinifer

Scientific classification
- Kingdom: Animalia
- Phylum: Arthropoda
- Class: Malacostraca
- Order: Decapoda
- Suborder: Pleocyemata
- Family: Parastacidae
- Genus: Euastacus; Clark, 1936

Type species
- Euastacus elongatus Clark, 1941

= Euastacus =

Genus of crayfishes

Euastacus is a genus of freshwater crayfish known as "spiny crayfish". They are found in the south-east of the Australian mainland, along with another genus of crayfish, Cherax. Both genera are members of the family Parastacidae, a family of freshwater crayfish restricted to the Southern Hemisphere.

Euastacus crayfish are distinguished from the smooth-shelled Cherax species by the short robust spikes on their claws and carapace, and frequently, their larger size. Many Euastacus species grow to a relatively large size, with the Murray River crayfish (Euastacus armatus) being the second largest freshwater crayfish species in the world. (The largest freshwater crayfish in the world is the Tasmanian giant freshwater crayfish (Astacopsis gouldi), found on the Australian island of Tasmania, and the genus Astacopsis is now known to be a very closely related sister genus to Euastacus.)

The genera Cherax and Euastacus continue a trend present in many Australian native freshwater fish genera of speciation into generalist lowland and specialist upland species. Generally, Cherax species inhabit lowland rivers at low to medium altitudes and swamps and ephemeral waters in inland areas of Australia including the Murray-Darling Basin. Conversely, Euastacus species are only found in permanent waters and generally inhabit upland rivers at medium to high altitudes in the Murray-Darling Basin as well as many easterly and southerly flowing coastal river systems. The partial exceptions to this are:

- the Murray River crayfish which was originally found along the entire length of the Murray River in addition to many upland habitats, and is still found in the middle reaches of the Murray River
- the Glenelg Spiny Crayfish (Eustacus bispinosus), found (or formerly found) in lowland areas of the Glenelg River system and Eight Mile Creek/Ewen Ponds system
- the Gippsland Crayfish (Euastacus kershawi), found in lowland areas of some streams in the Gippsland area.

Even when found in lowland habitats, these several more adaptable Euastacus crayfish are still highly dependent on reliable flows and good water quality, with good dissolved oxygen levels and low salinity. In contrast to Cherax (yabby) species, Euastacus species are unable to survive drying of their habitats.

The genus Cherax has a far wider distribution than the genus Euastacus, and is found in many parts of Australia including south-western Australia. The genus Euastacus is restricted to the south-east of the Australian mainland. There is a high degree of endemism in Euastacus species in coastal river systems, with many species restricted to single river or creek catchment. Euastacus species occur in several upland reservoirs.

Euastacus species are extremely slow growing, long-lived (possibly 40+ years in some species), and late to reach sexual maturity. These biological characteristics make Euastacus species vulnerable to environmental disturbances and essentially unable to support to catch-and-kill fisheries.

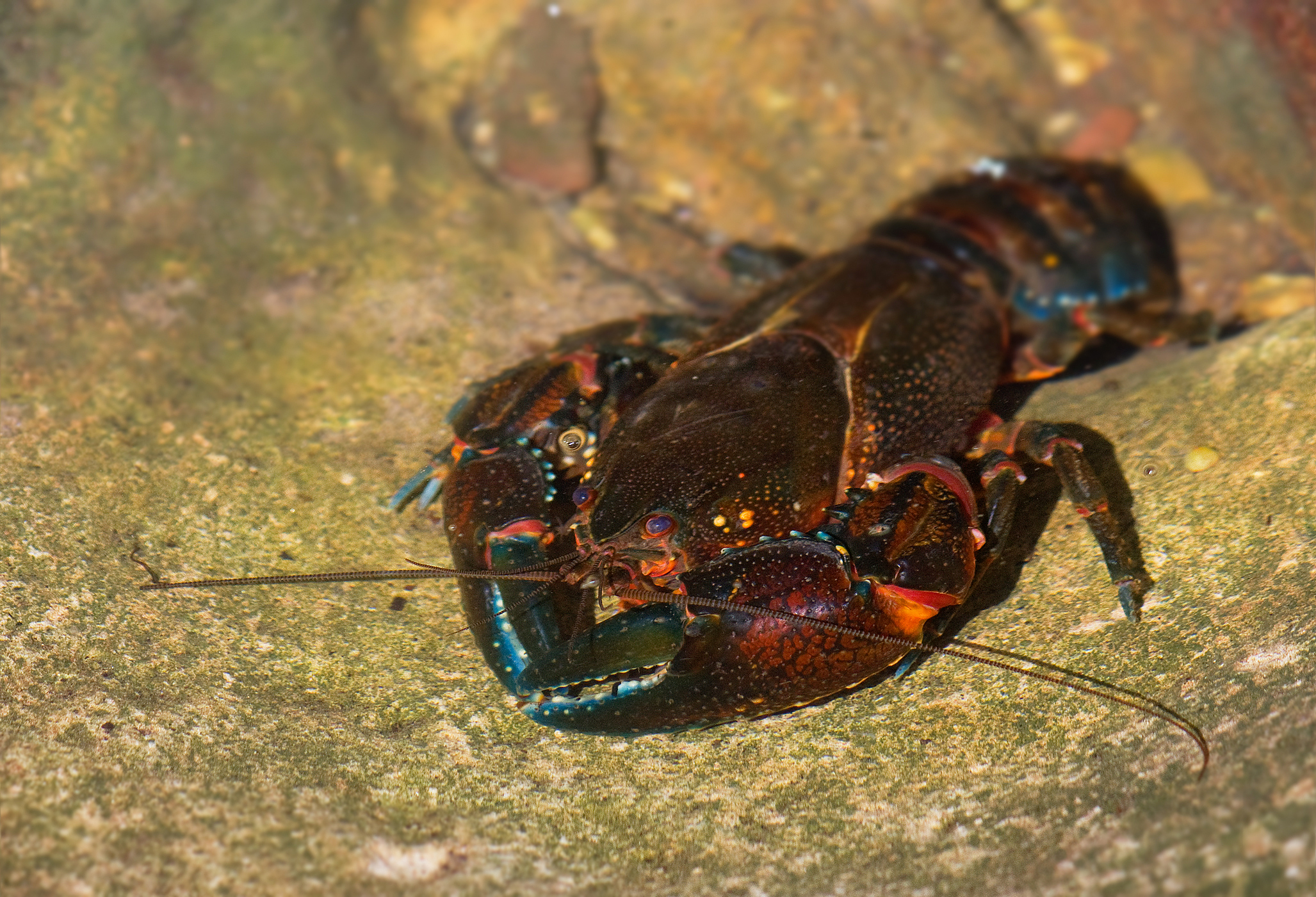
Euastacus sp.

== Species ==
Of the 50 species in the genus Euastacus, 17 are on the IUCN Red List as critically endangered (CR), 17 are endangered (EN), 5 vulnerable (VU), 1 near threatened (NT), 8 least concern (LC) and 1 is data deficient (DD):

- Euastacus armatus (Von Martens, 1866)
- Euastacus australasiensis (H. Milne-Edwards, 1837)
- Euastacus balanesis Morgan, 1988
- Euastacus bidawalis Morgan, 1986
- Euastacus bindal Morgan, 1989
- Euastacus bispinosus Clark, 1936
- Euastacus brachythorax Riek, 1969
- Euastacus clarkae Morgan, 1997
- Euastacus claytoni Riek, 1969
- Euastacus crassus Riek, 1969
- Euastacus dalagarbe Coughran, 2005
- Euastacus dangadi Morgan, 1997
- Euastacus diharawalus Morgan, 1997
- Euastacus diversus Riek, 1969
- Euastacus eungella Morgan, 1988
- Euastacus fleckeri (Watson, 1953)
- Euastacus gamilaroi Morgan, 1997
- Euastacus girurmulayn Coughran, 2005
- Euastacus gumar Morgan, 1997
- Euastacus guruhgi Coughran, 2005
- Euastacus guwinus Morgan, 1997
- Euastacus hirsutus (McCulloch, 1917)
- Euastacus hystricosus Riek, 1951
- Euastacus jagabar Coughran, 2005
- Euastacus jagara Morgan, 1988
- Euastacus kershawi Smith, 1912
- Euastacus maccai McCormack & Coughran, 2008
- Euastacus maidae (Riek, 1956)
- Euastacus mirangudjin Coughran, 2002
- Euastacus monteithorum Morgan, 1989
- Euastacus morgani Coughran & McCormack, 2011
- Euastacus neodiversus Riek, 1969
- Euastacus neohirsutus Riek, 1956
- Euastacus pilosus Coughran & Leckie, 2007
- Euastacus polysetosus Riek, 1951
- Euastacus reductus Riek, 1969
- Euastacus rieki Morgan, 1997
- Euastacus robertsi Monroe, 1977
- Euastacus setosus (Riek, 1956)
- Euastacus simplex Riek, 1956
- Euastacus spinichelatus Morgan, 1997
- Euastacus spinifer (Heller, 1865)
- Euastacus sulcatus Riek, 1951
- Euastacus suttoni Clark, 1941
- Euastacus urospinosus (Riek, 1956)
- Euastacus valentulus Riek, 1951
- Euastacus wiowuru Morgan, 1986
- Euastacus yanga Morgan, 1997
- Euastacus yarraensis (McCoy, 1888)
- Euastacus yigara Short & Davie, 1993
