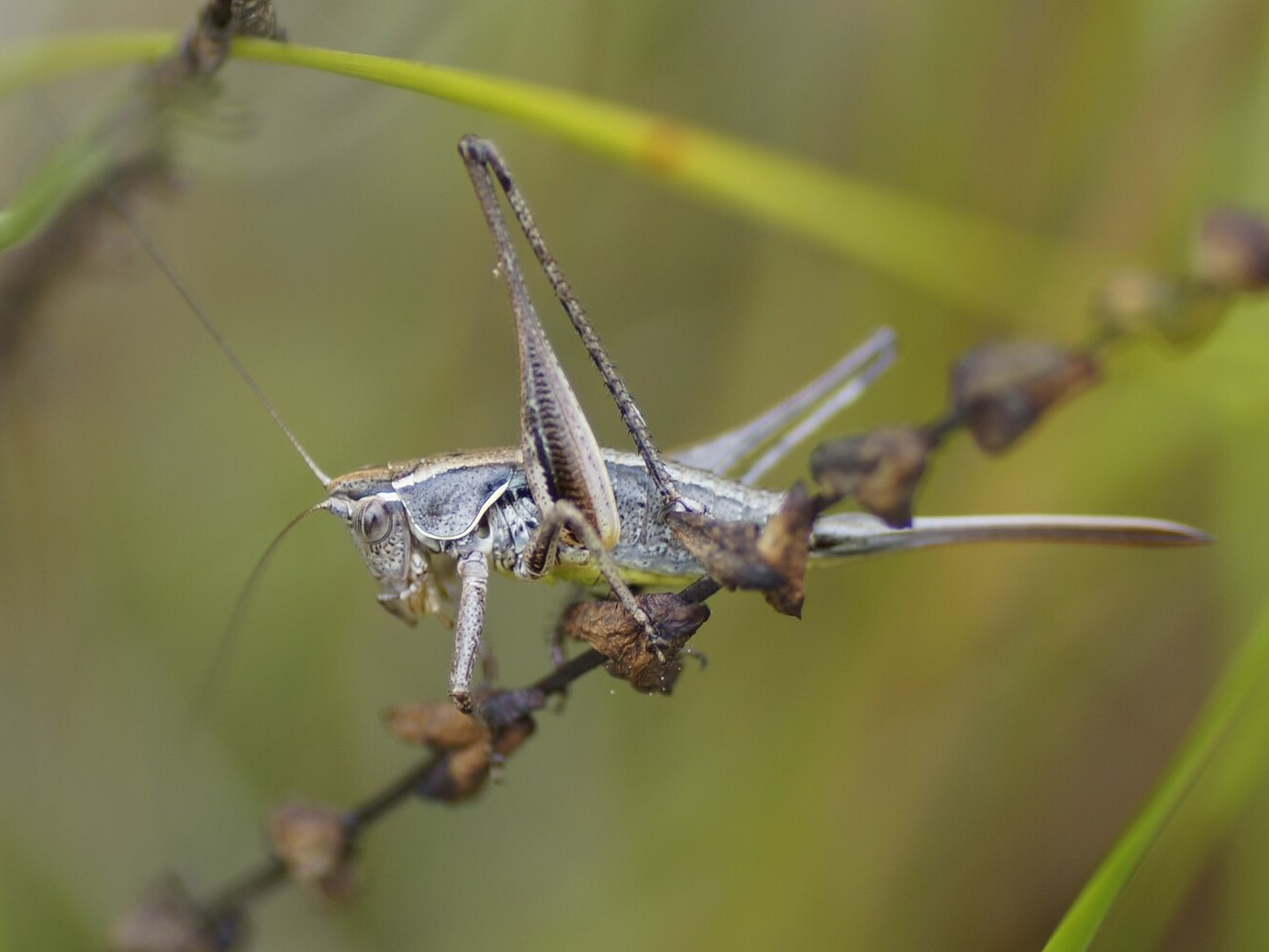
- Nanodectes veprephila

Scientific classification
- Domain: Eukaryota
- Kingdom: Animalia
- Phylum: Arthropoda
- Class: Insecta
- Order: Orthoptera
- Suborder: Ensifera
- Family: Tettigoniidae
- Subfamily: Tettigoniinae
- Tribe: Tettigoniini
- Genus: Nanodectes; Rentz, 1985

= Nanodectes =

Genus of cricket-like animals

Nanodectes is a genus of insects in the family Tettigoniidae. Species of the genus are found in Australia.

== Species ==
The following species are recognised in the genus Nanodectes:

- Nanodectes brachyurus Rentz, 1985
- Nanodectes bulbicercus Rentz, 1985
- Nanodectes dooloides Rentz, 1985
- Nanodectes dooloo Rentz, 1985
- Nanodectes formicivorae Mironov, 2008
- Nanodectes gladiator Rentz, 1985
- Nanodectes harpax Rentz, 1985
- Nanodectes platycercus Rentz, 1985
- Nanodectes triodiae Rentz, 1985
- Nanodectes veprephila Rentz, 1985
