= Homoeodera =

Scientific classification
- Kingdom: Animalia
- Phylum: Arthropoda
- Class: Insecta
- Order: Coleoptera
- Suborder: Polyphaga
- Infraorder: Cucujiformia
- Family: Anthribidae
- Genus: Homoeodera; Wollaston, T.V., 1870

Genus of beetles

Homoeodera is a genus of beetles belonging to the Anthribidae family.

== List of species ==
- Homoeodera alutaceicollis
- Homoeodera asteris
- Homoeodera compositarum
- Homoeodera coriacea
- Homoeodera edithia
- Homoeodera elateroides
- Homoeodera globulosa
- Homoeodera major
- Homoeodera nodulipennis
- Homoeodera paivae
- Homoeodera pumilio
- Homoeodera pygmaea
- Homoeodera rotundipennis
- Homoeodera scolytoides
