= Perbrinckia =

Scientific classification
- Kingdom: Animalia
- Phylum: Arthropoda
- Class: Malacostraca
- Order: Decapoda
- Suborder: Pleocyemata
- Infraorder: Brachyura
- Family: Gecarcinucidae
- Genus: Perbrinckia; Bott, 1969

Type species
- Thelphusa enodis Kingsley, 1880

Genus of crabs

Perbrinckia is a genus of freshwater crabs of the family Gecarcinucidae that is endemic to Sri Lanka, named after Per Brinck. Its natural habitats are subtropical or tropical moist lowland forests, subtropical or tropical swamps, and rivers. It contains 14 species, most of which are included on the IUCN Red List as critically endangered species (CR) or vulnerable species (VU) because they are threatened by habitat loss; only one species is of least concern (LC).

== Species ==
- Perbrinckia cracens Ng, 1995
- Perbrinckia enodis (Kinglsey, 1880)
- Perbrinckia fenestra Bahir & Ng, 2005
- Perbrinckia fido Ng, 1995
- Perbrinckia gabadagei Bahir & Ng, 2005
- Perbrinckia glabra Ng, 1995
- Perbrinckia integra Ng, 1995
- Perbrinckia morayensis Ng & Tay, 2001
- Perbrinckia punctata Ng, 1995
- Perbrinckia quadratus Ng & Tay, 2001
- Perbrinckia rosae Bahir & Ng, 2005
- Perbrinckia scansor (Ng, 1995)
- Perbrinckia scitula Ng, 1995
- Perbrinckia uva Bahir, 1998
