= Hybosida =

Scientific classification
- Kingdom: Animalia
- Phylum: Arthropoda
- Subphylum: Chelicerata
- Class: Arachnida
- Order: Araneae
- Infraorder: Araneomorphae
- Family: Palpimanidae
- Genus: Hybosida; Simon, 1898

Type species
- Hybosida lucida Simon, 1898

Species
- 4, see text

Genus of spiders

Hybosida is a genus of East African palp-footed spiders that was first described by Eugène Louis Simon in 1898.

== Species ==
As of June 2019 it contains four species, found only in Africa:

- Hybosida dauban Platnick, 1979 – Seychelles
- Hybosida lesserti Berland, 1920 – East Africa
- Hybosida lucida Simon, 1898 (type) – Seychelles
- Hybosida scabra Simon & Fage, 1922 – East Africa
