= Steriphopus wangala =

Scientific classification
- Kingdom: Animalia
- Phylum: Arthropoda
- Subphylum: Chelicerata
- Class: Arachnida
- Order: Araneae
- Infraorder: Araneomorphae
- Family: Palpimanidae
- Genus: Steriphopus
- Species: S. wangala

Binomial name
- Steriphopus wangala Kadam, Tripathi & Sankaran, 2024

Species of spider

Steriphopus wangala is a species of spider of the genus Steriphopus. It is endemic to Meghalaya, India and is named after the Wangala festival.
