= Euastacus diversus =

Conservation status
- Endangered (IUCN 3.1)

Scientific classification
- Domain: Eukaryota
- Kingdom: Animalia
- Phylum: Arthropoda
- Class: Malacostraca
- Order: Decapoda
- Suborder: Pleocyemata
- Family: Parastacidae
- Genus: Euastacus
- Species: E. diversus

Binomial name
- Euastacus diversus Riek, 1969

Species of crayfish

Euastacus diversus is a species of southern crawfish in the family Parastacidae.

The IUCN conservation status of Euastacus diversus is "EN", endangered. The species faces a high risk of extinction in the near future. The IUCN status was reviewed in 2010.
