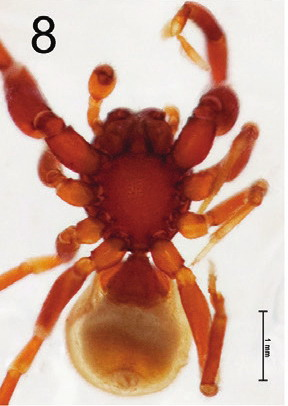

Scientific classification
- Kingdom: Animalia
- Phylum: Arthropoda
- Subphylum: Chelicerata
- Class: Arachnida
- Order: Araneae
- Infraorder: Araneomorphae
- Family: Palpimanidae
- Genus: Steriphopus
- Species: S. macleayi

Binomial name
- Steriphopus macleayi (O. Pickard-Cambridge, 1873)

= Steriphopus macleayi =

Species of spider

Steriphopus macleayi is a species of spider of the genus Steriphopus. It is endemic to Sri Lanka.

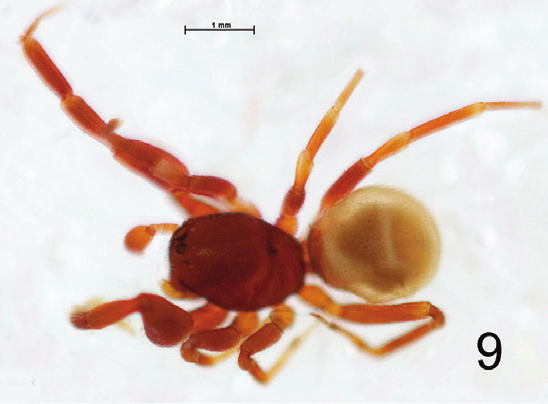
