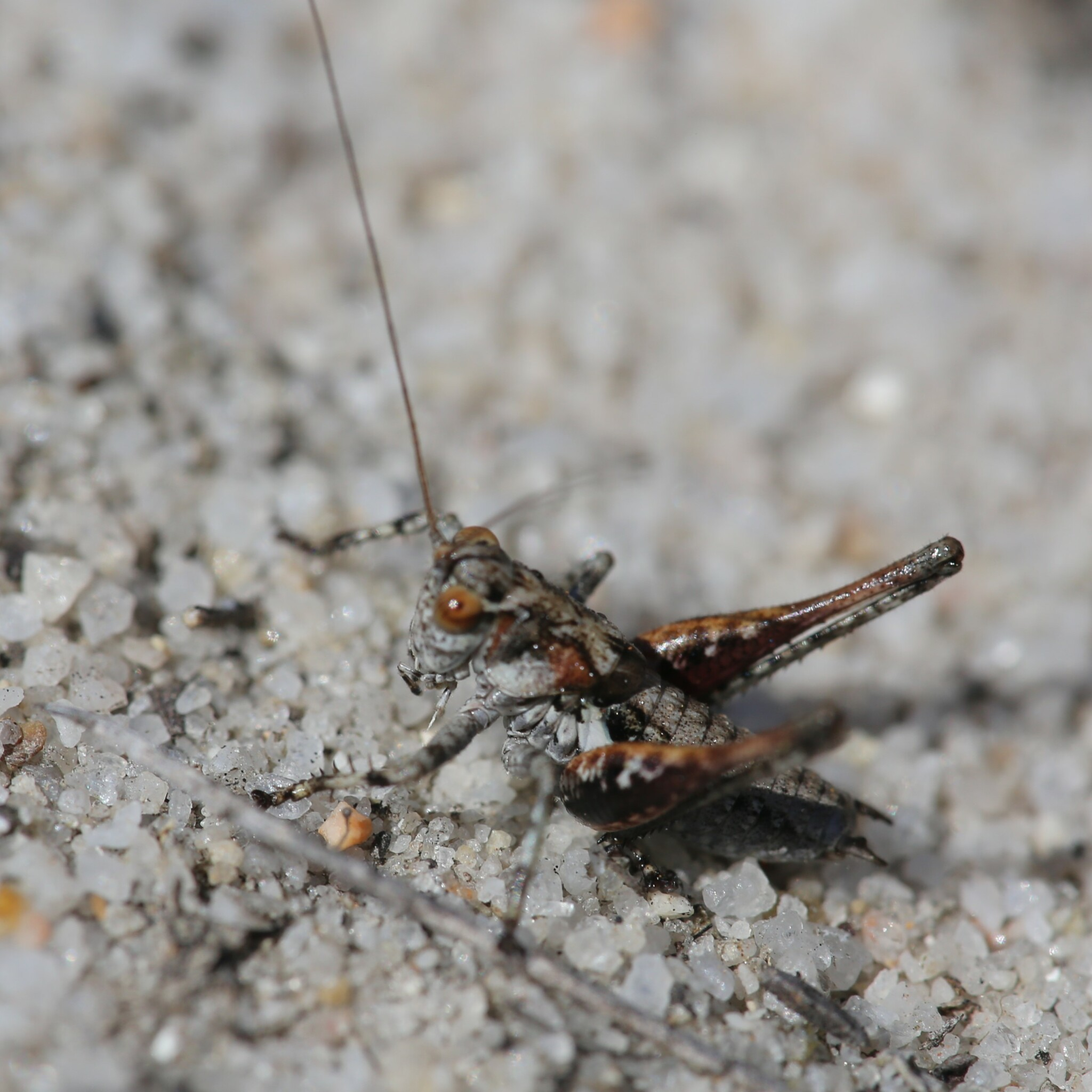

Scientific classification
- Domain: Eukaryota
- Kingdom: Animalia
- Phylum: Arthropoda
- Class: Insecta
- Order: Orthoptera
- Suborder: Ensifera
- Family: Tettigoniidae
- Subfamily: Tettigoniinae
- Tribe: Nedubini
- Genus: Ixalodectes; Rentz, 1985

= Ixalodectes =

Genus of cricket-like animals

Ixalodectes is a genus of Australian bush crickets.

== Species ==
The Orthoptera Species File lists:

- Ixalodectes flectocercus Rentz, 1985
- Ixalodectes megacercus Rentz, 1985
- Ixalodectes nigrifrons Rentz, 1985
- Ixalodectes uptoni Rentz, 1985
- Ixalodectes whitei Rentz, 1985
