= Flat-necked shieldback =

Conservation status
- Vulnerable (IUCN 3.1)

Scientific classification
- Kingdom: Animalia
- Phylum: Arthropoda
- Class: Insecta
- Order: Orthoptera
- Suborder: Ensifera
- Family: Tettigoniidae
- Genus: Arytropteris
- Species: A. basalis

Binomial name
- Arytropteris basalis (Walker, 1869)

Synonyms
- Thyreonotus basalis Walker, 1869

Species of cricket-like animal

The flat-necked shieldback (Arytropteris basalis) is a species of shield-backed katydid that is endemic to the coastal forests and thickets of KwaZulu-Natal province in South Africa. It is threatened by cultivation, mining and tourism.
