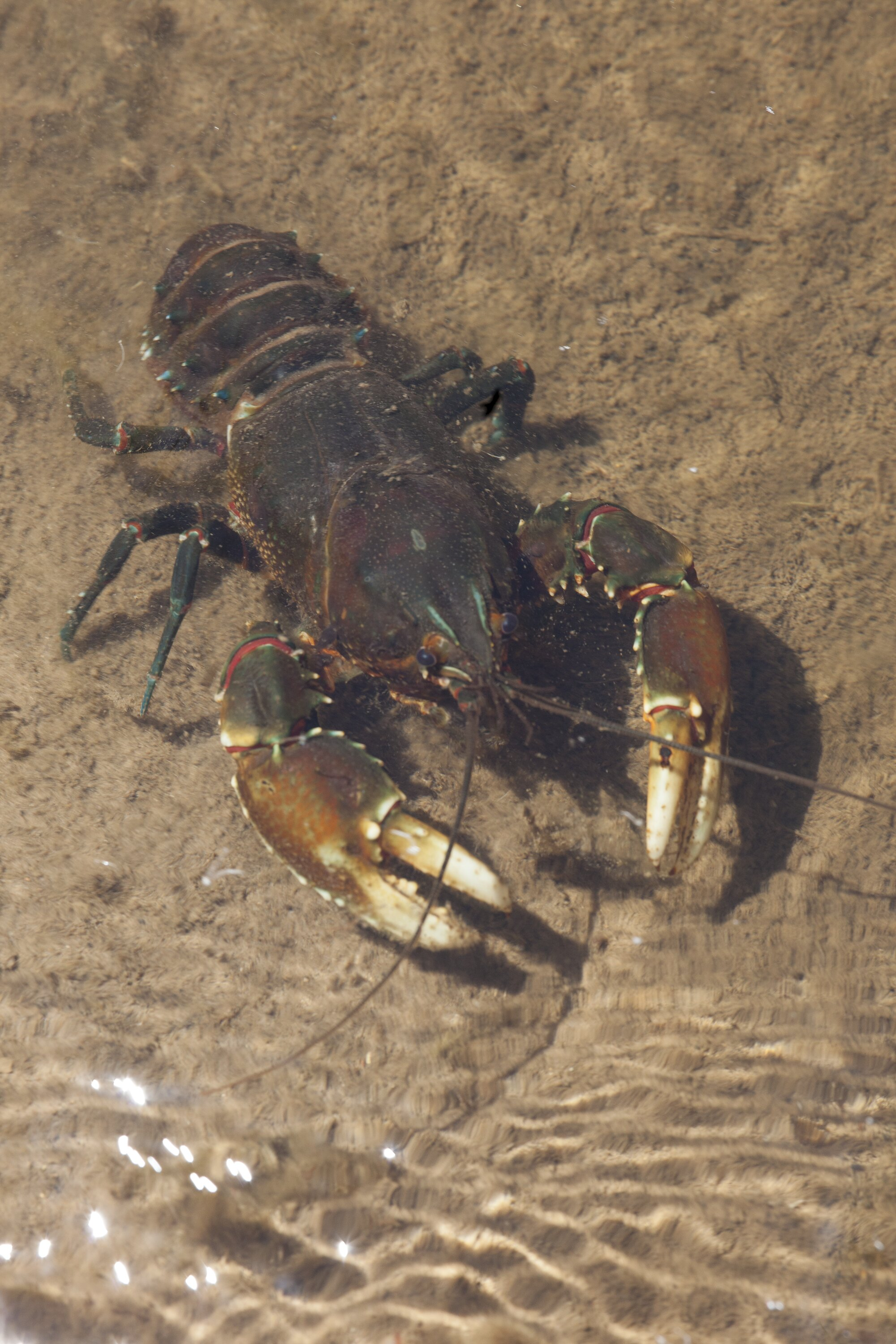
- Euastacus bispinosus, Grampians National Park, Victoria.

Conservation status
- Vulnerable (IUCN 3.1)

Scientific classification
- Kingdom: Animalia
- Phylum: Arthropoda
- Class: Malacostraca
- Order: Decapoda
- Suborder: Pleocyemata
- Family: Parastacidae
- Genus: Euastacus
- Species: E. bispinosus

Binomial name
- Euastacus bispinosus Clark, 1941

= Euastacus bispinosus =

Species of crayfish

Euastacus bispinosus, the Glenelg spiny crayfish, is a species of southern crawfish in the family Parastacidae.

The IUCN conservation status of Euastacus bispinosus is "VU", vulnerable. The species faces a high risk of endangerment in the medium term. The IUCN status was reviewed in 2010.
