= Ceylonthelphusa soror =

Conservation status
- Least Concern (IUCN 3.1)

Scientific classification
- Kingdom: Animalia
- Phylum: Arthropoda
- Class: Malacostraca
- Order: Decapoda
- Suborder: Pleocyemata
- Infraorder: Brachyura
- Family: Gecarcinucidae
- Genus: Ceylonthelphusa
- Species: C. soror

Binomial name
- Ceylonthelphusa soror (Zehntner, 1894)

Species of crab

Ceylonthelphusa soror is a species of crab in the family Gecarcinucidae.

The IUCN conservation status of Ceylonthelphusa soror is "LC", least concern, with no immediate threat to the species' survival. The population is stable. The IUCN status was reviewed in 2008.
