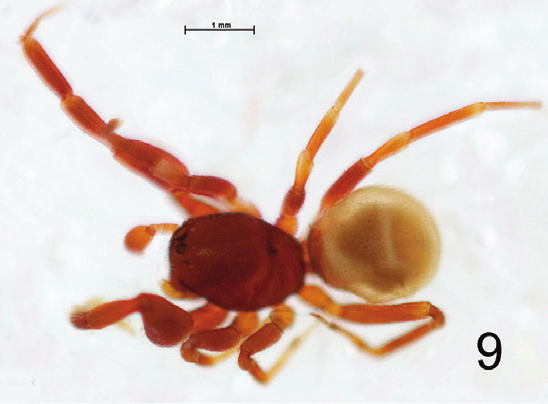
- Male Steriphopus macleayi

Scientific classification
- Kingdom: Animalia
- Phylum: Arthropoda
- Subphylum: Chelicerata
- Class: Arachnida
- Order: Araneae
- Infraorder: Araneomorphae
- Family: Palpimanidae
- Genus: Steriphopus; Simon, 1887

Type species
- S. macleayi (O. Pickard-Cambridge, 1873)

Species
- 5, see text

= Steriphopus =

Genus of spiders

Steriphopus is a genus of palp-footed spiders that was first described by Eugène Louis Simon in 1887.

== Species ==
As of June 2024 it contains five species, found only in Asia, Sri Lanka, India and on the Seychelles:

- Steriphopus benjamini Zonstein & Marusik, 2023 – India
- Steriphopus crassipalpis Tamerlan Thorell, 1895 – Myanmar
- Steriphopus lacertosus Simon, 1898 – Seychelles
- Steriphopus macleayi O. Pickard-Cambridge, 1873 (type) – Sri Lanka
- Steriphopus wangala Kadam, Tripathi & Sankaran, 2024 – India
