= Steriphopus lacertosus =

Conservation status
- Critically endangered, possibly extinct (IUCN 3.1)

Scientific classification
- Kingdom: Animalia
- Phylum: Arthropoda
- Subphylum: Chelicerata
- Class: Arachnida
- Order: Araneae
- Infraorder: Araneomorphae
- Family: Palpimanidae
- Genus: Steriphopus
- Species: S. lacertosus

Binomial name
- Steriphopus lacertosus (Simon, 1898)

Species of spider

Steriphopus lacertosus is a species of spider in the family Palpimanidae native to the Seychelles. The species is listed as critically endangered (possibly extinct).
