= Kapcypridopsis barnardi =

Conservation status
- Critically Endangered (IUCN 2.3)

Scientific classification
- Kingdom: Animalia
- Phylum: Arthropoda
- Clade: Pancrustacea
- Class: Ostracoda
- Order: Podocopida
- Family: Cyprididae
- Genus: Kapcypridopsis
- Species: K. barnardi

Binomial name
- Kapcypridopsis barnardi McKenzie, 1977

Species of seed shrimp

Kapcypridopsis barnardi is a species of ostracod crustacean in the family Cyprididae, subfamily Cypridopsinae. It is endemic to Table Mountain in South Africa.
