= Perbrinckia integra =

Conservation status
- Vulnerable (IUCN 3.1)

Scientific classification
- Kingdom: Animalia
- Phylum: Arthropoda
- Class: Malacostraca
- Order: Decapoda
- Suborder: Pleocyemata
- Infraorder: Brachyura
- Family: Gecarcinucidae
- Genus: Perbrinckia
- Species: P. integra

Binomial name
- Perbrinckia integra Ng, 1995

Species of crab

Perbrinckia integra is a species of freshwater crabs of the family Gecarcinucidae that is endemic to Sri Lanka. The species is categorized as vulnerable by founders due to habitat destruction and human interference. The species is found around Adam's Peak area only. It is found, and known to live under moist rocks, and near water sources.
