= Homoeodera elateroides =

Conservation status
- Critically Endangered (IUCN 3.1)

Scientific classification
- Kingdom: Animalia
- Phylum: Arthropoda
- Class: Insecta
- Order: Coleoptera
- Suborder: Polyphaga
- Infraorder: Cucujiformia
- Family: Anthribidae
- Genus: Homoeodera
- Species: H. elateroides

Binomial name
- Homoeodera elateroides (Wollaston, 1877)

Species of beetle

Homoeodera elateroides, the click beetle-like fungus weevil is a species of beetle belonging to the family Anthribidae. The species is endemic to Saint Helena.
