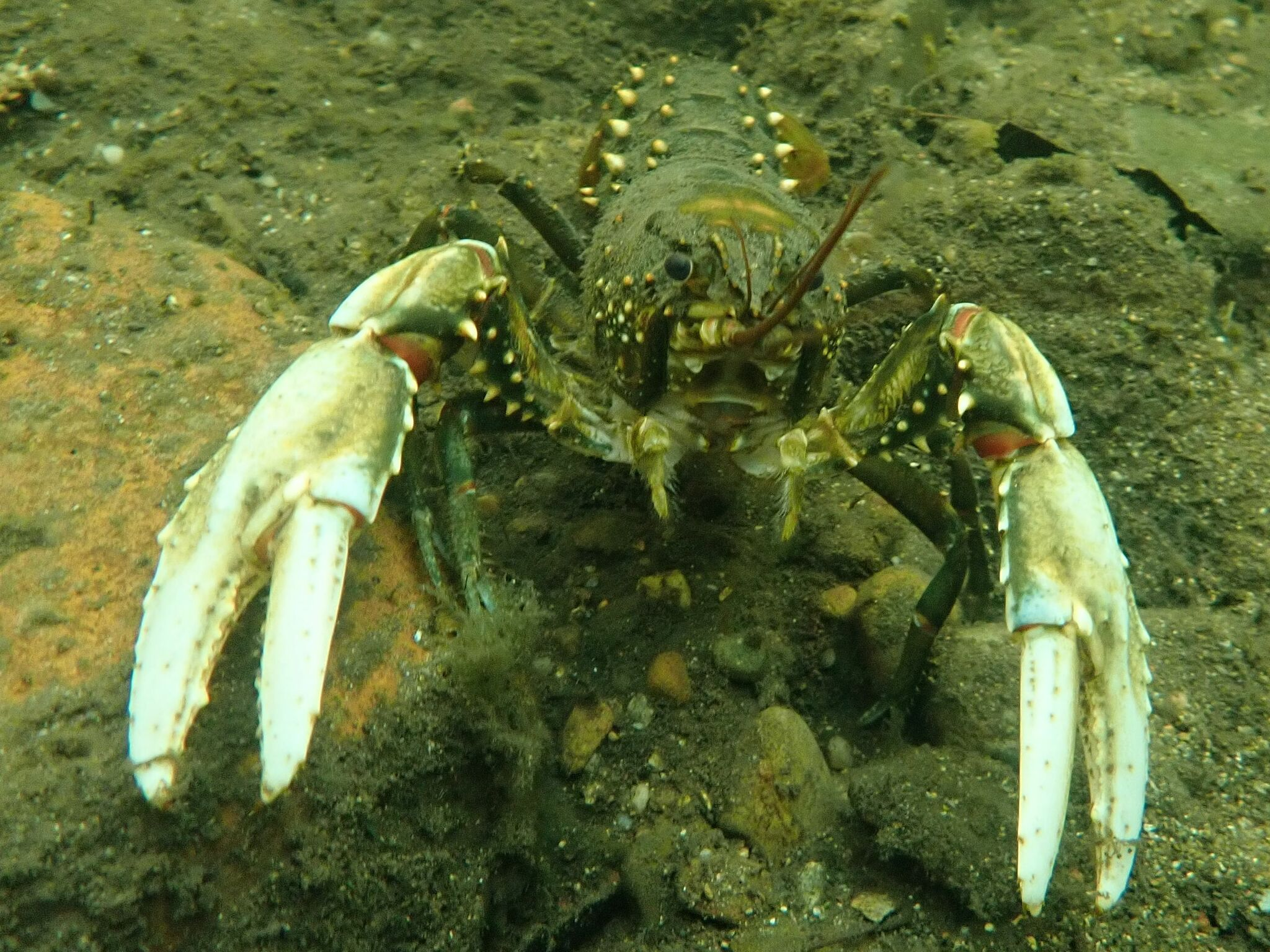

Conservation status
- Data Deficient (IUCN 3.1)

Scientific classification
- Kingdom: Animalia
- Phylum: Arthropoda
- Class: Malacostraca
- Order: Decapoda
- Suborder: Pleocyemata
- Family: Parastacidae
- Genus: Euastacus
- Species: E. armatus

Binomial name
- Euastacus armatus (Von Martens, 1866)

= Murray crayfish =

Species of crayfish

The Murray crayfish, Euastacus armatus, is a species of freshwater crayfish endemic to Australia that belongs to the family Parastacidae. The Murray crayfish has the largest geographic range of any of the Euastacus crayfish in Australia, being found in the Murray and Murrumbidgee Rivers as well as many of their tributaries. Murray crayfish are also known as "Murray River crayfish", "Murray crays", "freshwater crays", "spiny freshwater crays", "spinies" and in the Wagga Wagga region of southern New South Wales they are simply known as "lobsters".

Today adults commonly grow to 20–30 centimetres (8–12 in) in length. In the past however they have been reliably recorded at significantly larger lengths and up to 2 kilograms (4.4 lb) in weight; the Murray crayfish is considered the second largest freshwater crayfish species in the world after the Tasmanian giant freshwater crayfish. Murray crayfish have large white claws and a dark olive/grey/black carapace, all of which are covered in short robust spikes. In small individuals, the claws are green and yellow. The crayfish begin to breed when they are 15–20 cm (6–8 in) long, which takes between 6 and 9 years. When the crayfish has reached sexual maturity the females lay 500 to 1,000 eggs in late autumn; the eggs are carried on the female's pleopods until they hatch in summer. Murray crayfish feed predominantly on decaying aquatic plant matter but will also eat dead animals.

The range of the Murray crayfish extends to over 700 m above sea level in large and small upland streams and several upland impoundments, and to relatively low altitudes in the Murray and Murrumbidgee Rivers; historically its distribution extended throughout the southern Murray–Darling basin, but fishing pressure and environmental change has resulted in the species no longer being found in the Murray River downstream of Mildura. Like all Euastacus species, Murray crayfish prefer cool, fast-flowing water, deep pools, boulder-rich streambeds, and areas with extensive riparian vegetation.

The species is threatened by overfishing and as a result there are many restrictions in place for recreational fishers, all of which vary from state to state. In New South Wales and Victoria these include a minimum size, bag and possession limits, and a ban on taking females with eggs. Further there is a limited season in which the species can be taken (start of May to the end of August). Murray crayfish are also threatened by habitat loss, with a 91% decline in the abundance of this species recorded in one stream (Goobarragandra River) over a six-year period when there was a halving in the availability of their preferred boulder habitats due to sedimentation. Murray crayfish are listed as Data Deficient on the IUCN Red List, as vulnerable in the Australian Capital Territory, and as endangered in South Australia. Lately, though, the numbers have increased thanks to the efforts of scientists.
