= Perbrinckia fenestra =

Conservation status
- Vulnerable (IUCN 3.1)

Scientific classification
- Kingdom: Animalia
- Phylum: Arthropoda
- Class: Malacostraca
- Order: Decapoda
- Suborder: Pleocyemata
- Infraorder: Brachyura
- Family: Gecarcinucidae
- Genus: Perbrinckia
- Species: P. fenestra

Binomial name
- Perbrinckia fenestra Bahir & Ng, 2005

Species of crab

Perbrinckia fenestra is a species of freshwater crabs of the family Gecarcinucidae that is endemic to Sri Lanka. the species is categorized as vulnerable by founders due to their single locality where tourist destinations are abundant. The site is Batatotalena Cave in Kuruwita. It is rarely found, and known to live under moist rocks, near water sources and under wet litter.
