= Euastacus bindal =

Conservation status
- Critically Endangered (IUCN 3.1)

Scientific classification
- Kingdom: Animalia
- Phylum: Arthropoda
- Class: Malacostraca
- Order: Decapoda
- Suborder: Pleocyemata
- Family: Parastacidae
- Genus: Euastacus
- Species: E. bindal

Binomial name
- Euastacus bindal Morgan, 1989

Species of crayfish

Euastacus bindal is a species of southern crawfish in the family Parastacidae.

The IUCN conservation status of Euastacus bindal is "CR", critically endangered. The species faces an extremely high risk of extinction in the immediate future. The IUCN status was reviewed in 2010.
