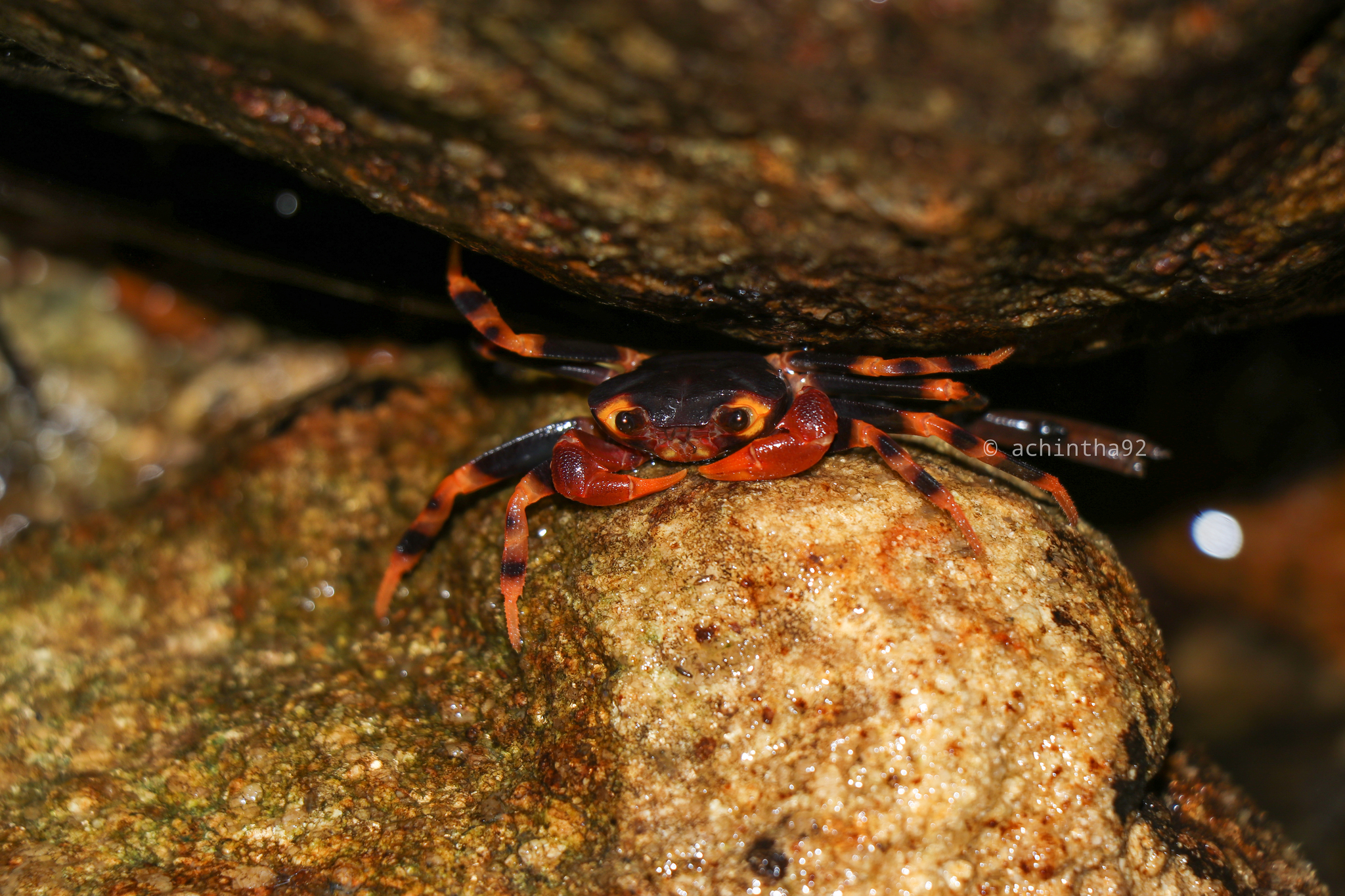
- From Hiniduma, Galle District, Sri Lanka

Conservation status
- Least Concern (IUCN 3.1)

Scientific classification
- Kingdom: Animalia
- Phylum: Arthropoda
- Clade: Pancrustacea
- Class: Malacostraca
- Order: Decapoda
- Suborder: Pleocyemata
- Infraorder: Brachyura
- Family: Gecarcinucidae
- Genus: Perbrinckia
- Species: P. scansor

Binomial name
- Perbrinckia scansor (Ng, 1995)

Synonyms
- Oziotelphusa scansor Ng, 1995

= Sri Lanka tree crab =

Species of crab

The Sri Lanka tree crab, (Perbrinckia scansor), is a species of freshwater crabs of the family Gecarcinucidae that is endemic to Sri Lanka. It is the only known tree climbing freshwater crab found in the country. The crab is discovered from 11 localities from Sri Lanka throughout Kalu River, Walawe River and Gin River basins. Adults are known to survive well in rainwater-filled tree hollows (phytotelma) of trees such as Shorea sp., Artocarpus sp., Dillenia sp., Garcinia sp., Myristica sp., and Gyrinops walla. Females with young can be seen during February and March on the ground, never within tree hollows. The known predators are Greater coucal, White-throated kingfisher, Sri Lanka grey hornbill and Eurasian otter.

The species is categorized as least concern by IUCN, but the habitats are gradually declining. The water bodies of central hills are invaded by exotic species of fish and other aquatic flora and usage of many areas for human habitations are known to harm the animal. They are also collected illegally and used for many purposes locally and overseas.
