= Homoeodera scolytoides =

Conservation status
- Critically Endangered (IUCN 3.1)

Scientific classification
- Kingdom: Animalia
- Phylum: Arthropoda
- Clade: Pancrustacea
- Class: Insecta
- Order: Coleoptera
- Suborder: Polyphaga
- Infraorder: Cucujiformia
- Family: Anthribidae
- Genus: Homoeodera
- Species: H. scolytoides

Binomial name
- Homoeodera scolytoides (Basilewsky, 1972)

Species of beetle

Homoeodera scolytoides is a species of beetle belonging to the family Anthribidae. H. scolytoides is specifically distinguished by the second segments of its antennae which are very long, much longer than the third and even the scape .
