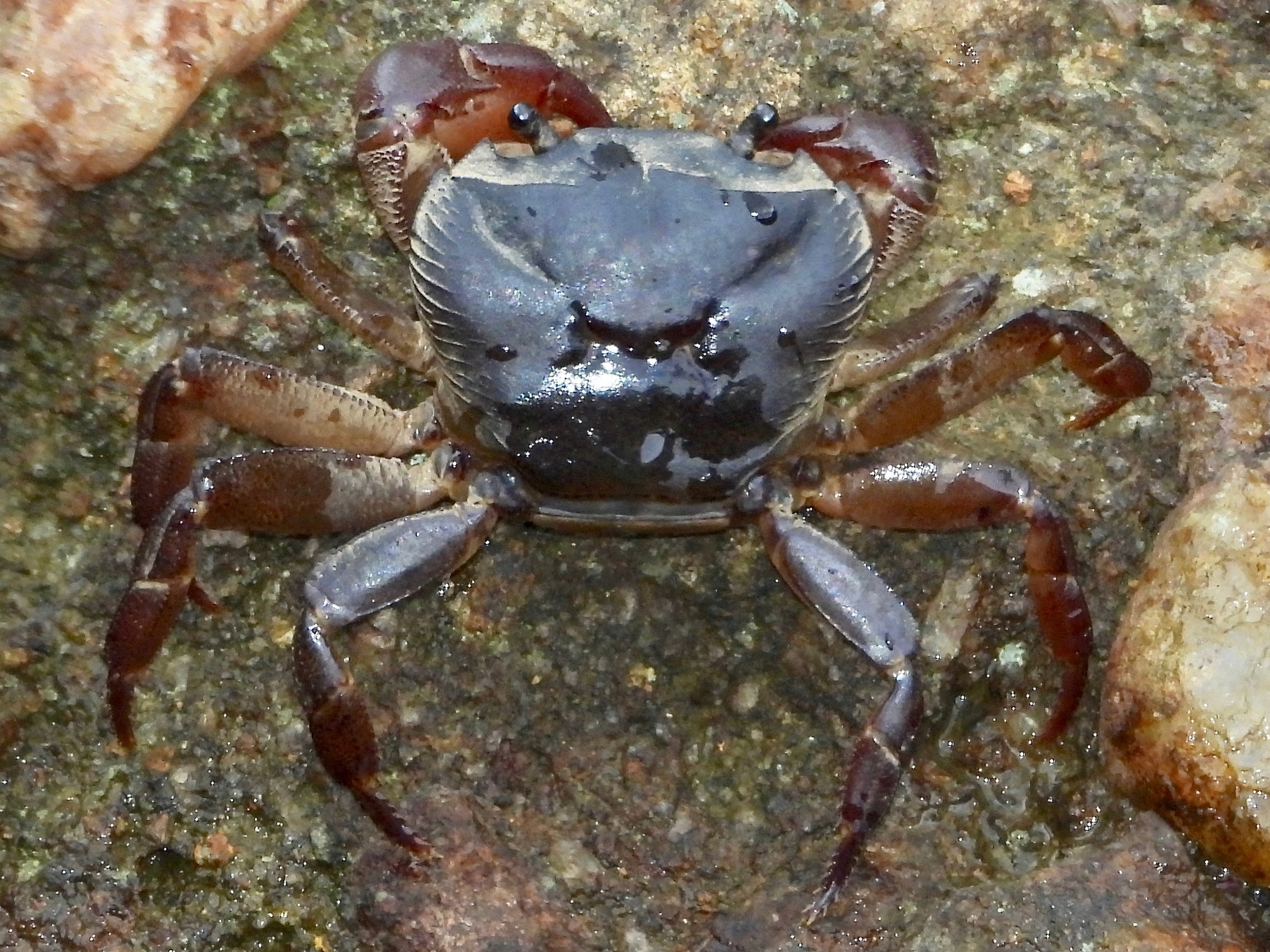

Conservation status
- Least Concern (IUCN 3.1)

Scientific classification
- Kingdom: Animalia
- Phylum: Arthropoda
- Class: Malacostraca
- Order: Decapoda
- Suborder: Pleocyemata
- Infraorder: Brachyura
- Family: Gecarcinucidae
- Genus: Ceylonthelphusa
- Species: C. rugosa

Binomial name
- Ceylonthelphusa rugosa (Kingsley, 1880)

= Ceylonthelphusa rugosa =

Species of crab

Ceylonthelphusa rugosa is a species of crab in the family Gecarcinucidae.

The IUCN conservation status of Ceylonthelphusa rugosa is "LC", least concern, with no immediate threat to the species' survival. The population is stable. The IUCN status was reviewed in 2008.
