= Euastacus guruhgi =

Conservation status
- Critically Endangered (IUCN 3.1)

Scientific classification
- Domain: Eukaryota
- Kingdom: Animalia
- Phylum: Arthropoda
- Class: Malacostraca
- Order: Decapoda
- Suborder: Pleocyemata
- Family: Parastacidae
- Genus: Euastacus
- Species: E. guruhgi

Binomial name
- Euastacus guruhgi Coughran, 2005

Species of crayfish

Euastacus guruhgi is a species of freshwater crayfish found in the Australian state of New South Wales. It has an estimated extent of occurrence of 80 square kilometres (31 sq mi) and an area of occupancy of 7.5 square kilometres (2.9 sq mi) where it occurs fragmentedly. The species has been assessed as a critically endangered species due to a continuing decline in the quality of its habitat due to the invasive exotic species in the area, some of which predate upon this species. Furthermore, there is a continual destruction of its suitable rainforest habitat. E. guruhgi also faces the consequences of global warming; as a restricted range species, it is dependent on cool headwater streams and a slight increase in the temperature of the water could rapidly eradicate the species. There are no specific conservation measures for this species in place but the distribution range of the E. guruhgi falls within the Mount Warning and Wollumbin national parks. In New South Wales, there is a minimum recreational size limit of 90 mm orbital carpace length for any spiny crayfish. E. guruhgi does not attain that size, and is thus, indirectly protected by this restriction.
