= Ixalodectes flectocercus =

Conservation status
- Critically Endangered (IUCN 2.3)

Scientific classification
- Kingdom: Animalia
- Phylum: Arthropoda
- Class: Insecta
- Order: Orthoptera
- Suborder: Ensifera
- Family: Tettigoniidae
- Subfamily: Tettigoniinae
- Tribe: Nedubini
- Genus: Ixalodectes
- Species: I. flectocercus

Binomial name
- Ixalodectes flectocercus Rentz, 1985

Species of cricket-like animal

Ixalodectes flectocercus is a species of bush cricket endemic to Australia.
