= Ceylonthelphusa venusta =

Conservation status
- Near Threatened (IUCN 3.1)

Scientific classification
- Kingdom: Animalia
- Phylum: Arthropoda
- Class: Malacostraca
- Order: Decapoda
- Suborder: Pleocyemata
- Infraorder: Brachyura
- Family: Gecarcinucidae
- Genus: Ceylonthelphusa
- Species: C. venusta

Binomial name
- Ceylonthelphusa venusta (Ng, 1995)

Species of crab

Ceylonthelphusa venusta is a species of crab in the family Gecarcinucidae.

The IUCN conservation status of Ceylonthelphusa venusta is "NT", near threatened. The species may be considered threatened in the near future. The IUCN status was reviewed in 2008.
