= Ceylonthelphusa sentosa =

Conservation status
- Least Concern (IUCN 3.1)

Scientific classification
- Kingdom: Animalia
- Phylum: Arthropoda
- Class: Malacostraca
- Order: Decapoda
- Suborder: Pleocyemata
- Infraorder: Brachyura
- Family: Gecarcinucidae
- Genus: Ceylonthelphusa
- Species: C. sentosa

Binomial name
- Ceylonthelphusa sentosa Bahir, 1999

Species of crab

Ceylonthelphusa sentosa is a species of crab in the family Gecarcinucidae.

The IUCN conservation status of Ceylonthelphusa sentosa is "LC", least concern, with no immediate threat to the species' survival. The population is stable. The IUCN status was reviewed in 2008.
