= Ceylonthelphusa cavatrix =

Conservation status
- Endangered (IUCN 3.1)

Scientific classification
- Kingdom: Animalia
- Phylum: Arthropoda
- Class: Malacostraca
- Order: Decapoda
- Suborder: Pleocyemata
- Infraorder: Brachyura
- Family: Gecarcinucidae
- Genus: Ceylonthelphusa
- Species: C. cavatrix

Binomial name
- Ceylonthelphusa cavatrix (Bahir, 1998)

Species of crab

Ceylonthelphusa cavatrix is a species of crab in the family Gecarcinucidae.

The IUCN conservation status of Ceylonthelphusa cavatrix is "EN", endangered. The species faces a high risk of extinction in the near future. The IUCN status was reviewed in 2017.
