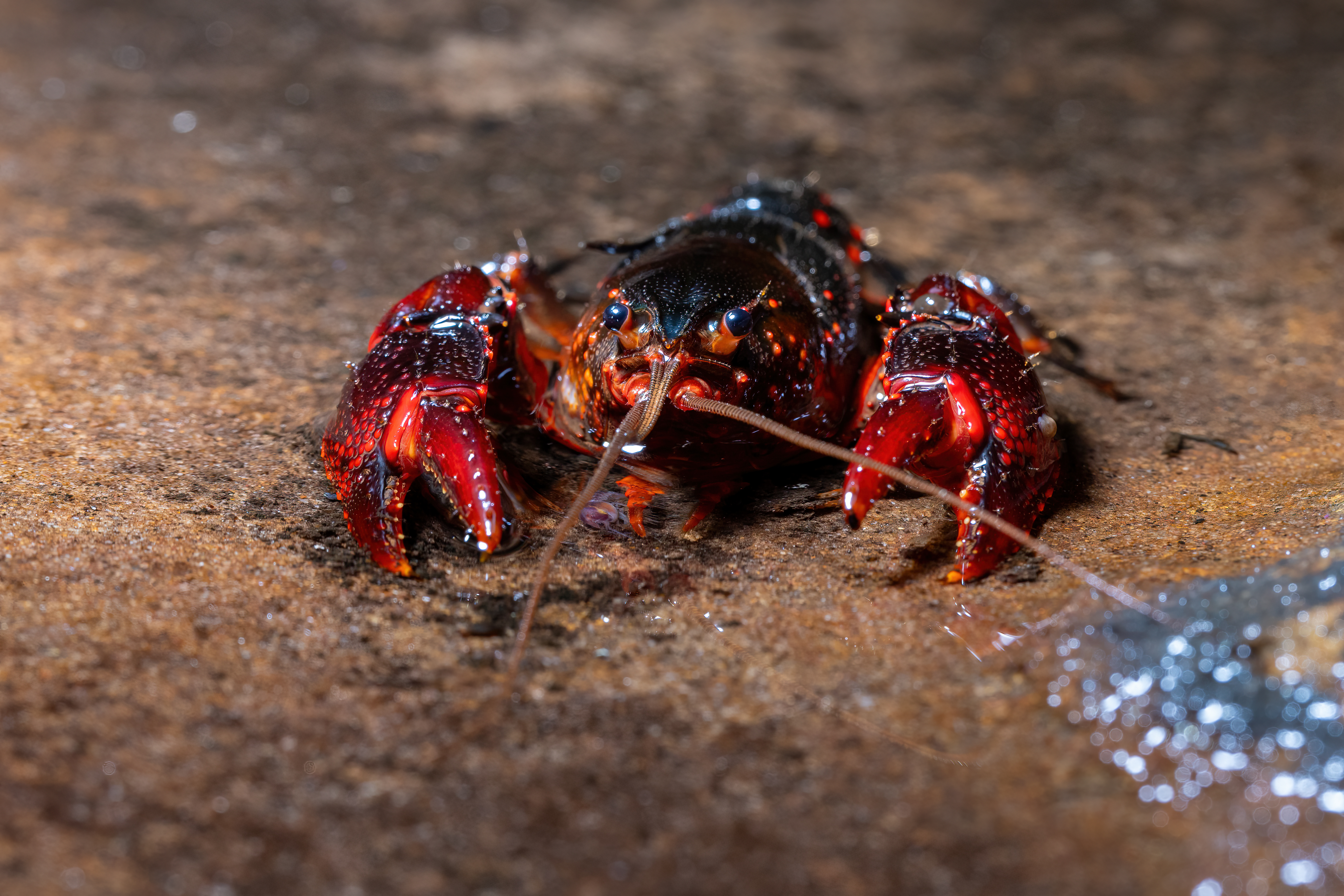

Conservation status
- Least Concern (IUCN 3.1)

Scientific classification
- Kingdom: Animalia
- Phylum: Arthropoda
- Clade: Pancrustacea
- Class: Malacostraca
- Order: Decapoda
- Suborder: Pleocyemata
- Family: Parastacidae
- Genus: Euastacus
- Species: E. spinifer

Binomial name
- Euastacus spinifer (Heller, 1865)
- Range of Euastacus spinifer (orange) in Australia

Synonyms
- Astacoides spinifer Heller,1865; Cancer serratus Shaw, 1794; Astacopsis paramattensis Spence Bate, 1888; Euastacus spinosus Riek, 1956

= Euastacus spinifer =

Species of crayfish

Euastacus spinifer is a species of freshwater crayfish endemic to Australia that belongs to the family Parastacidae.

It was first described in 1865 as Astacoides spinifer by Camill Heller, but has been redescribed many times. The argument for the synonymy of the various names has been accepted.

== Appearance ==
Morphological variation is observed in Euastacus spinifer that originate in different river systems. They are mostly green with reddish-brown joints and bright spines.

== Diet ==
Detritus forms the staple diet of the species but they may also eat small invertebrates and tadpoles. They are also cannibalistic. They are also believed to be opportunistic omnivores.

== Life cycle ==
Mating takes place in winter when temperature drops to as low as 15 °C (59 °F), and eggs are laid in early July. Eggs are carried in the female Pleopods and hatch after an incubation period of 110–140 days. Hatch-lings stay with their parents until early summer. Males mature in 5–6 years and grow to 11 centimetres (4 in) on maturity while females take about 8 years and grow to lengths above 14 centimetres (6 in). There is a class of "precious males" that mature at 4 centimetres (2 in) length. There are slight variations in reproduction cycle between species in different river systems.

== Size ==
Euastacus spinifer may grow up to 24 centimetres (9 in). Largest recorded weight is 1.8 kilograms (4.0 lb).

== Distribution ==
They are endemic to Australia. They may be found from near sea level to as high as 1,200 metres (3,900 ft). They are distributed over a range of 55,000 square kilometres (21,000 sq mi).

== Habitat ==
Creeks and estuaries are their usual habitats. Their habitats are usually shaded by vegetation.

== Moulting ==
Moulting frequency of individuals in the species differs with size: smaller individuals moult up to six times a year while larger individuals moult only once a year. Different sizes moult at different seasons with temperature believed to be the regulating force.
