= Euastacus hystricosus =

Conservation status
- Endangered (IUCN 3.1)

Scientific classification
- Kingdom: Animalia
- Phylum: Arthropoda
- Clade: Pancrustacea
- Class: Malacostraca
- Order: Decapoda
- Suborder: Pleocyemata
- Family: Parastacidae
- Genus: Euastacus
- Species: E. hystricosus

Binomial name
- Euastacus hystricosus Riek, 1951

Species of crayfish

Euastacus hystricosus, the Conondale spiny crayfish is a species of southern crawfish in the family Parastacidae. It is endemic to Queensland in Australia. It is listed as Endangered by the Australian government, and as also Endangered on the IUCN Red List.

== Description ==
Adult Euastacus hystricosus are dark green, with red, orange, or yellow claw tips. The tailfan may sometimes be orange. It reaches around 1.6 kg in weight and an ocular carapace length of 15.6 cm.

== Range and habitat ==
The species is found in the Mary River and Brisbane River drainages, in headwaters approximately 475 m above sea level. It prefers shaded, well-oxygenated, flowing headwaters in wet sclerophyll forest and rainforest. It lives in permanent riffles, runs, glides and pools, and takes shelter under rocks, logs, and burrows. It is suspected it cannot tolerate temperatures higher than ~23°C.

Because this crayfish's habitat is around 475 m in altitude, lowland areas are a barrier to dispersal. This has resulted in three genetically distinct subpopulations.

== Ecology ==
Euastacus hystricosus is largely nocturnal.

They breed annually, usually in mid-autumn, with an average of 900 eggs attaching to the female's swimmerets under the tail. Eggs hatch and develop through the larval stage before detaching from the female in spring to early summer. Predation of juvenile crayfish is likely very high.

== Conservation and threats ==
The species was listed as Endangered in 2010 by the IUCN Red List. The assessment concluded that due to its very restricted range, Euastacus hystricosus was vulnerable to localized threats such as bush fires, habitat destruction, collection, and predation by introduced species such as the cane toad and feral cats.

In 2024, Euastacus hystricosus was added as Endangered to Australia's list of threatened species under the EPBC Act. The major threats cited were climate change, high intensity fires, and collection by humans. Climate change is a threat as the crayfish's range has already been restricted by drying conditions. Extreme hot weather events could dry up riffles and pools or heat the water to lethal temperatures, and flooding could cause mass kills and hypoxic water conditions. In addition, warming temperatures and drought increase the risk of high intensity fires that can kill Euastacus hystricosus and alter its habitat.

Prescribed burns are currently undertaken in the three National Parks where this crayfish occurs and Queensland clearing policies have reduced the threat of land clearing. Other conservation efforts proposed by the DCCEEW are monitoring of population and habitat quality, controlling illegal collection for the aquarium trade, reviewing fire management policies, providing education to private landowners, and develop monitoring programs for feral pigs and weeds.
