= Perbrinckia uva =

Scientific classification
- Kingdom: Animalia
- Phylum: Arthropoda
- Class: Malacostraca
- Order: Decapoda
- Suborder: Pleocyemata
- Infraorder: Brachyura
- Family: Gecarcinucidae
- Genus: Perbrinckia
- Species: P. uva

Binomial name
- Perbrinckia uva Bahir, 1998

Species of crab

Perbrinckia uva is a species of freshwater crabs of the family Gecarcinucidae that is endemic to Sri Lanka.
