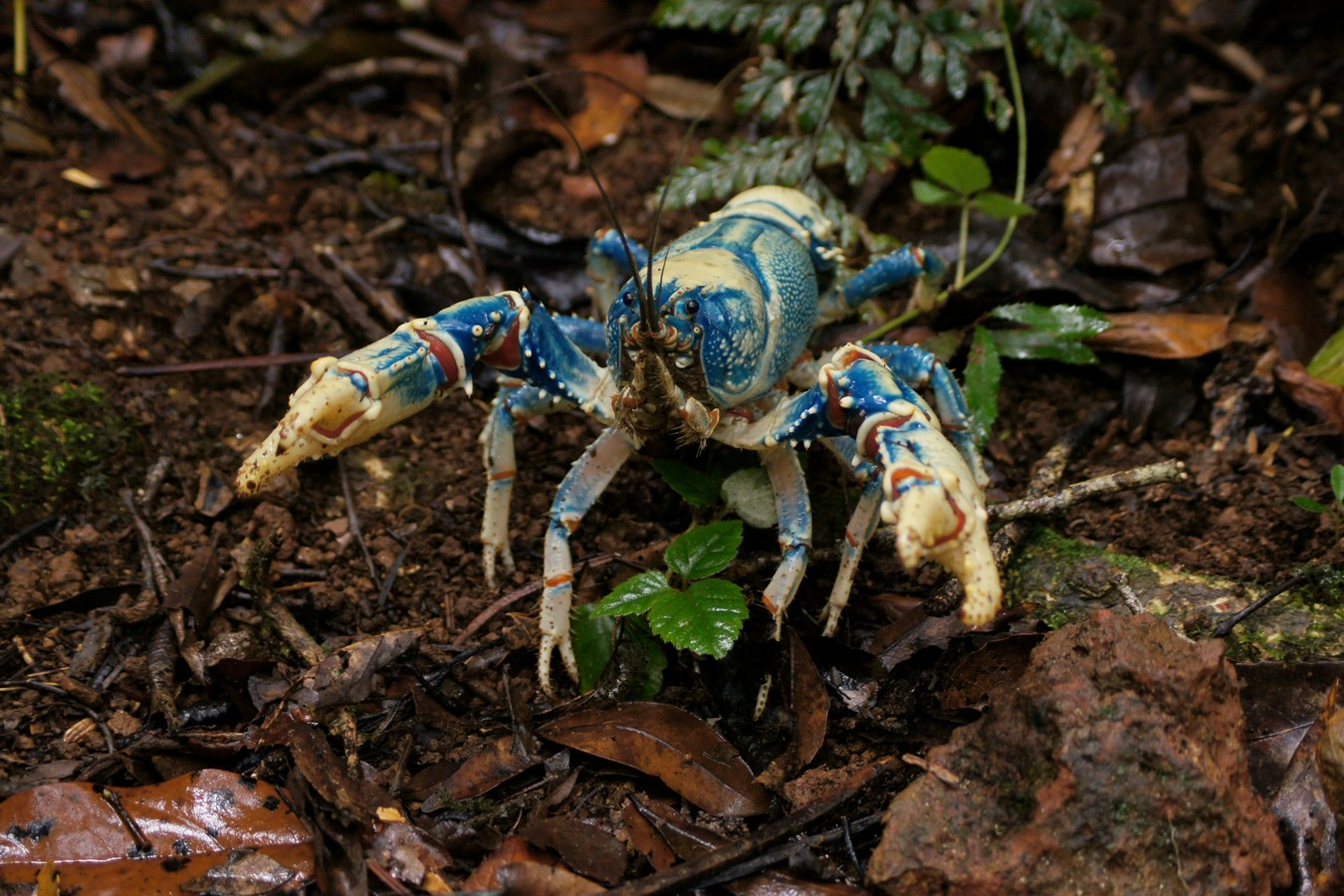
- Euastacus sulcatus in Lamington National Park, Queensland, Australia
- Red/white variant in Mount Barney National Park, Queensland, Australia.

Conservation status
- Vulnerable (IUCN 3.1)

Scientific classification
- Kingdom: Animalia
- Phylum: Arthropoda
- Clade: Pancrustacea
- Class: Malacostraca
- Order: Decapoda
- Suborder: Pleocyemata
- Family: Parastacidae
- Genus: Euastacus
- Species: E. sulcatus

Binomial name
- Euastacus sulcatus Riek, 1951

= Euastacus sulcatus =

Species of crayfish

Euastacus sulcatus, also known as the Lamington crayfish, is a freshwater crayfish, or "yabby", native to Australia. It is commonly bright blue in colour although also existing in a red and white, rusty red, brown, green, orange and completely white variations are found all around its known region. They can be found roaming the forest floor when conditions are damp, usually after substantial rainfall, actively searching for a mate, new territory or food. When threatened, it raises its front two powerful pincers and will readily pinch any potential predator. The spiny crayfish has zero native predators by the time it reaches full-size maturity, although since the introduction of feral animals such as foxes and cats, it has suffered from predation not evolved to defend itself against. Due to its magnificent coloration it has also been targeted as a aquarium pet or even winding up on barbecues. This species is listed as protected and is an offence to trap/remove or harm this species, with on-the-spot fines of up to $522.

== Distribution ==
Restricted to streams bordered by rainforest and sometimes wet eucalyptus forest at more than 300 m altitude. Inhabits mountains in a crescent from Mount Tamborine to Lamington Plateau, west along Macpherson Range and north via Cunningham's Gap into the Mistake Mountains, Queensland. Also seen nearby in Northern NSW in Goonengerry National Park

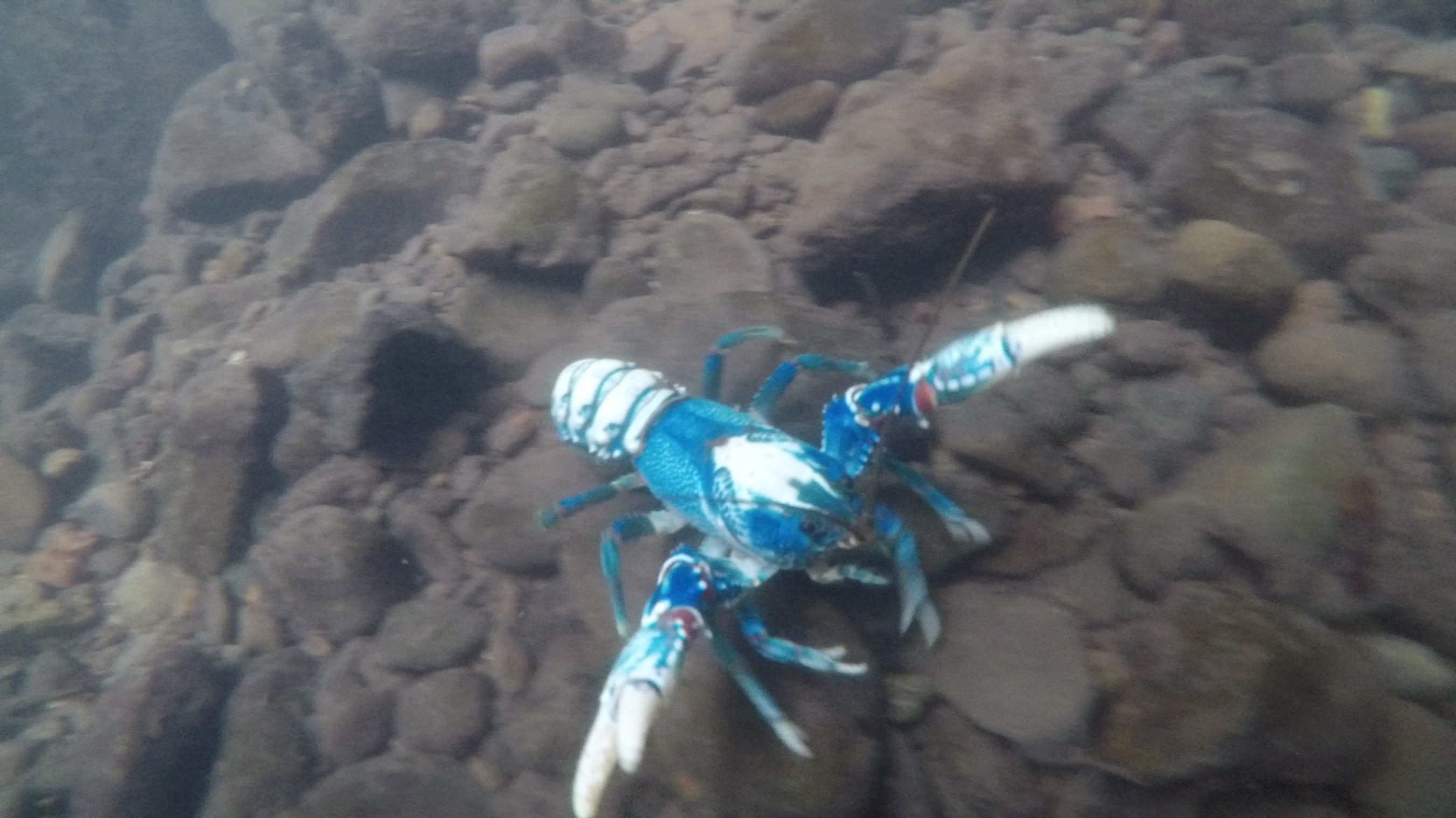
The defensive position of a spiny Lamington crayfish (underwater)

== Habitat ==
The species occurs in streams and creeks at altitudes above 300 metres (980 ft) in rainforests.
