= Arytropteris pondo =

Conservation status
- Critically Endangered (IUCN 3.1)

Scientific classification
- Domain: Eukaryota
- Kingdom: Animalia
- Phylum: Arthropoda
- Class: Insecta
- Order: Orthoptera
- Suborder: Ensifera
- Family: Tettigoniidae
- Genus: Arytropteris
- Species: A. pondo

Binomial name
- Arytropteris pondo (Rentz, 1988)

Species of cricket-like animal

Arytropteris pondo, the Pondo flat-necked shieldback, is a species of shield-backed katydid. The species is endemic to South Africa.
