= Hybosida dauban =

Conservation status
- Critically Endangered (IUCN 3.1)

Scientific classification
- Kingdom: Animalia
- Phylum: Arthropoda
- Subphylum: Chelicerata
- Class: Arachnida
- Order: Araneae
- Infraorder: Araneomorphae
- Family: Palpimanidae
- Genus: Hybosida
- Species: H. dauban

Binomial name
- Hybosida dauban Platnick, 1979

Species of spider

Hybosida dauban is a species of spider found on Silhouette Island in the Seychelles.
