= Ceylonthelphusa alpina =

Conservation status
- Endangered (IUCN 3.1)

Scientific classification
- Kingdom: Animalia
- Phylum: Arthropoda
- Clade: Pancrustacea
- Class: Malacostraca
- Order: Decapoda
- Suborder: Pleocyemata
- Infraorder: Brachyura
- Family: Gecarcinucidae
- Genus: Ceylonthelphusa
- Species: C. alpina

Binomial name
- Ceylonthelphusa alpina (Bahir & Ng, 2005)

Species of crab

Ceylonthelphusa alpina is a species of freshwater crabs in the family Gecarcinucidae. The species is endemic to Sri Lanka, and is classed as an endangered due to habitat degradation.
