= Euastacus maidae =

Conservation status
- Critically Endangered (IUCN 3.1)

Scientific classification
- Kingdom: Animalia
- Phylum: Arthropoda
- Class: Malacostraca
- Order: Decapoda
- Suborder: Pleocyemata
- Family: Parastacidae
- Genus: Euastacus
- Species: E. maidae

Binomial name
- Euastacus maidae Riek, 1956

Species of crayfish

Euastacus maidae is a species of Australian crayfish in the family Parastacidae. It is known only from a single catchment in the Gold Coast hinterland in the State of Queensland, Australia, and is listed as critically endangered on the IUCN Red List. The stream is surrounded by Subtropical Rainforest. This species may also occur in adjacent high rainfall catchments.
