= Euastacus jagara =

Conservation status
- Critically Endangered (IUCN 3.1)

Scientific classification
- Kingdom: Animalia
- Phylum: Arthropoda
- Class: Malacostraca
- Order: Decapoda
- Suborder: Pleocyemata
- Family: Parastacidae
- Genus: Euastacus
- Species: E. jagara

Binomial name
- Euastacus jagara Morgan, 1989

Species of crayfish

Euastacus jagara is a species of Australian crayfish in the family Parastacidae. It is known from only six specimens, all collected at the type locality in the Mistake Mountains in the State of Queensland, Australia. The streams inhabited by the species are surrounded by Upland Subtropical Rainforest, and drain into the Brisbane River. The species is listed as critically endangered on the IUCN Red List.
