= Euastacus yigara =

Conservation status
- Critically Endangered (IUCN 3.1)

Scientific classification
- Kingdom: Animalia
- Phylum: Arthropoda
- Class: Malacostraca
- Order: Decapoda
- Suborder: Pleocyemata
- Family: Parastacidae
- Genus: Euastacus
- Species: E. yigara

Binomial name
- Euastacus yigara Short & Davie, 1993

Species of crayfish

Euastacus yigara is a species of southern crawfish in the family Parastacidae.

The IUCN conservation status of Euastacus yigara is "CR", critically endangered. The species faces an extremely high risk of extinction in the immediate future. The IUCN status was reviewed in 2010.
