= Nanodectes bulbicercus =

Conservation status
- Critically Endangered (IUCN 2.3)

Scientific classification
- Kingdom: Animalia
- Phylum: Arthropoda
- Class: Insecta
- Order: Orthoptera
- Suborder: Ensifera
- Family: Tettigoniidae
- Genus: Nanodectes
- Species: N. bulbicercus

Binomial name
- Nanodectes bulbicercus Rentz, 1985

Species of cricket-like animal

Nanodectes bulbicercus is a species of insect in the family Tettigoniidae. It is endemic to Australia.
