= Ceylonthelphusa kandambyi =

Conservation status
- Near Threatened (IUCN 3.1)

Scientific classification
- Kingdom: Animalia
- Phylum: Arthropoda
- Class: Malacostraca
- Order: Decapoda
- Suborder: Pleocyemata
- Infraorder: Brachyura
- Family: Gecarcinucidae
- Genus: Ceylonthelphusa
- Species: C. kandambyi

Binomial name
- Ceylonthelphusa kandambyi Bahir, 1999

Species of crab

Ceylonthelphusa kandambyi is a species of decapod in the family Gecarcinucidae.

The IUCN conservation status of Ceylonthelphusa kandambyi is "NT", near threatened. The species may be considered threatened in the near future. The population is stable. The IUCN status was reviewed in 2008.
