= Ceylonthelphusa diva =

Conservation status
- Endangered (IUCN 3.1)

Scientific classification
- Kingdom: Animalia
- Phylum: Arthropoda
- Class: Malacostraca
- Order: Decapoda
- Suborder: Pleocyemata
- Infraorder: Brachyura
- Family: Gecarcinucidae
- Genus: Ceylonthelphusa
- Species: C. diva

Binomial name
- Ceylonthelphusa diva N.G.Bahir, 2005

Species of crab

Ceylonthelphusa diva is a species of decapod in the family Gecarcinucidae.

The IUCN conservation status of Ceylonthelphusa diva is "EN", endangered. The species faces a high risk of extinction in the near future. The IUCN status was reviewed in 2008.
