= Euastacus robertsi =

Conservation status
- Critically Endangered (IUCN 3.1)

Scientific classification
- Kingdom: Animalia
- Phylum: Arthropoda
- Class: Malacostraca
- Order: Decapoda
- Suborder: Pleocyemata
- Family: Parastacidae
- Genus: Euastacus
- Species: E. robertsi

Binomial name
- Euastacus robertsi Monroe, 1977

Species of crayfish

Euastacus robertsi is a species of southern crawfish in the family Parastacidae.

The IUCN conservation status of Euastacus robertsi is "CR", critically endangered. The species faces an extremely high risk of extinction in the immediate future. The IUCN status was reviewed in 2010.
