= Perbrinckia quadratus =

Conservation status
- Critically Endangered (IUCN 3.1)

Scientific classification
- Kingdom: Animalia
- Phylum: Arthropoda
- Class: Malacostraca
- Order: Decapoda
- Suborder: Pleocyemata
- Infraorder: Brachyura
- Family: Gecarcinucidae
- Genus: Perbrinckia
- Species: P. quadratus

Binomial name
- Perbrinckia quadratus Ng & Tay, 2001

Species of crab

Perbrinckia quadratus is a species of crab in the family Gecarcinucidae.

The IUCN has assessed the conservation status of Perbrinckia quadratus as critically endangered; the species faces an extremely high risk of extinction in the immediate future.
