= Perbrinckia cracens =

Conservation status
- Critically Endangered (IUCN 3.1)

Scientific classification
- Kingdom: Animalia
- Phylum: Arthropoda
- Class: Malacostraca
- Order: Decapoda
- Suborder: Pleocyemata
- Infraorder: Brachyura
- Family: Gecarcinucidae
- Genus: Perbrinckia
- Species: P. cracens

Binomial name
- Perbrinckia cracens Ng, 1995

Species of crab

Perbrinckia cracens is a species of crab in the family Gecarcinucidae.

The IUCN conservation status of Perbrinckia cracens is "CR", critically endangered. The species faces an extremely high risk of extinction in the immediate future.
