= Ceylonthelphusa nata =

Conservation status
- Critically Endangered (IUCN 3.1)

Scientific classification
- Kingdom: Animalia
- Phylum: Arthropoda
- Class: Malacostraca
- Order: Decapoda
- Suborder: Pleocyemata
- Infraorder: Brachyura
- Family: Gecarcinucidae
- Genus: Ceylonthelphusa
- Species: C. nata

Binomial name
- Ceylonthelphusa nata Ng & Tay, 2001

Species of crab

Ceylonthelphusa nata is a species of crab in the family Gecarcinucidae.

The IUCN conservation status of Ceylonthelphusa nata is "CR", critically endangered. The species faces an extremely high risk of extinction in the immediate future. The IUCN status was reviewed in 2008.
