= Perbrinckia morayensis =

Conservation status
- Critically Endangered (IUCN 3.1)

Scientific classification
- Kingdom: Animalia
- Phylum: Arthropoda
- Class: Malacostraca
- Order: Decapoda
- Suborder: Pleocyemata
- Infraorder: Brachyura
- Family: Gecarcinucidae
- Genus: Perbrinckia
- Species: P. morayensis

Binomial name
- Perbrinckia morayensis Ng & Tay, 2001

Species of crab

Perbrinckia morayensis is a species of crab in the family Gecarcinucidae.

The IUCN conservation status of Perbrinckia morayensis is "CR", critically endangered. The species faces an extremely high risk of extinction in the immediate future.
