= Perbrinckia glabra =

Conservation status
- Critically Endangered (IUCN 3.1)

Scientific classification
- Kingdom: Animalia
- Phylum: Arthropoda
- Class: Malacostraca
- Order: Decapoda
- Suborder: Pleocyemata
- Infraorder: Brachyura
- Family: Gecarcinucidae
- Genus: Perbrinckia
- Species: P. glabra

Binomial name
- Perbrinckia glabra Ng, 1995

Species of crab

Perbrinckia glabra is a species of freshwater crab of the family Gecarcinucidae that is endemic to Sri Lanka. The species is categorized as critically endangered by the IUCN Red List due to their single locality in Horton Plains National Park. Perbrinckia glabra is found primarily under rocks and boulders near shallow streams. Major threats to this species include habitat loss and pollution.
