= Perbrinckia rosae =

Conservation status
- Critically Endangered (IUCN 3.1)

Scientific classification
- Kingdom: Animalia
- Phylum: Arthropoda
- Class: Malacostraca
- Order: Decapoda
- Suborder: Pleocyemata
- Infraorder: Brachyura
- Family: Gecarcinucidae
- Genus: Perbrinckia
- Species: P. rosae

Binomial name
- Perbrinckia rosae N.G.Bahir, 2005

Species of crab

Perbrinckia rosae is a species of crab in the family Gecarcinucidae.

The IUCN conservation status of Perbrinckia rosae is "CR", critically endangered. The species faces an extremely high risk of extinction in the immediate future.
