= Perbrinckia scitula =

Conservation status
- Critically Endangered (IUCN 3.1)

Scientific classification
- Kingdom: Animalia
- Phylum: Arthropoda
- Clade: Pancrustacea
- Class: Malacostraca
- Order: Decapoda
- Suborder: Pleocyemata
- Infraorder: Brachyura
- Family: Gecarcinucidae
- Genus: Perbrinckia
- Species: P. scitula

Binomial name
- Perbrinckia scitula Ng, 1995

Species of crab

Perbrinckia scitula is a species of freshwater crabs of the family Gecarcinucidae that is endemic to Sri Lanka. The species is categorized as critically endangered by the founders due to its two localities not being protected by law. A very small number can be found among human habitations. The species is distributed along the Mahaweli River basin, around Deltota and Talawakelle areas.
