= Ceylonthelphusa callista =

Conservation status
- Critically Endangered (IUCN 3.1)

Scientific classification
- Kingdom: Animalia
- Phylum: Arthropoda
- Class: Malacostraca
- Order: Decapoda
- Suborder: Pleocyemata
- Infraorder: Brachyura
- Family: Gecarcinucidae
- Genus: Ceylonthelphusa
- Species: C. callista

Binomial name
- Ceylonthelphusa callista (Ng, 1995)

Synonyms
- Perbrinckia callista Ng, 1995

Species of crab

Ceylonthelphusa callista is a species of freshwater crabs in the family Gecarcinucidae. The species is endemic to Sri Lanka and is known from the Knuckles Mountain Range. It was found on wet boulders on the margins of a slow-flowing stream at an elevation of 915 m (3,000 ft) above sea level.
