= Ceylonthelphusa durrelli =

Conservation status
- Critically Endangered (IUCN 3.1)

Scientific classification
- Kingdom: Animalia
- Phylum: Arthropoda
- Clade: Pancrustacea
- Class: Malacostraca
- Order: Decapoda
- Suborder: Pleocyemata
- Infraorder: Brachyura
- Family: Gecarcinucidae
- Genus: Ceylonthelphusa
- Species: C. durrelli

Binomial name
- Ceylonthelphusa durrelli N.G.Bahir, 2005

Species of crab

Ceylonthelphusa durrelli is a species of decapod in the family Gecarcinucidae. It is native to Central Province, Sri Lanka.

The IUCN conservation status of Ceylonthelphusa durrelli is "CR", critically endangered. The species faces an extremely high risk of extinction in the immediate future. The IUCN status was reviewed in 2008.
