= Ceylonthelphusa orthos =

Conservation status
- Critically Endangered (IUCN 3.1)

Scientific classification
- Kingdom: Animalia
- Phylum: Arthropoda
- Clade: Pancrustacea
- Class: Malacostraca
- Order: Decapoda
- Suborder: Pleocyemata
- Infraorder: Brachyura
- Family: Gecarcinucidae
- Genus: Ceylonthelphusa
- Species: C. orthos

Binomial name
- Ceylonthelphusa orthos Ng & Tay, 2001

Species of crab

Ceylonthelphusa orthos is a species of crab in the family Gecarcinucidae.

The IUCN conservation status of Ceylonthelphusa orthos is "CR", critically endangered. The species faces an extremely high risk of extinction in the immediate future. The IUCN status was reviewed in 2008.
