= Perbrinckia fido =

Conservation status
- Critically Endangered (IUCN 3.1)

Scientific classification
- Kingdom: Animalia
- Phylum: Arthropoda
- Class: Malacostraca
- Order: Decapoda
- Suborder: Pleocyemata
- Infraorder: Brachyura
- Family: Gecarcinucidae
- Genus: Perbrinckia
- Species: P. fido

Binomial name
- Perbrinckia fido Ng & Tay, 2001

Species of crab

Perbrinckia fido is a species of crab in the family Gecarcinucidae.

The IUCN conservation status of Perbrinckia fido is "CR", critically endangered. The species faces an extremely high risk of extinction in the immediate future.
