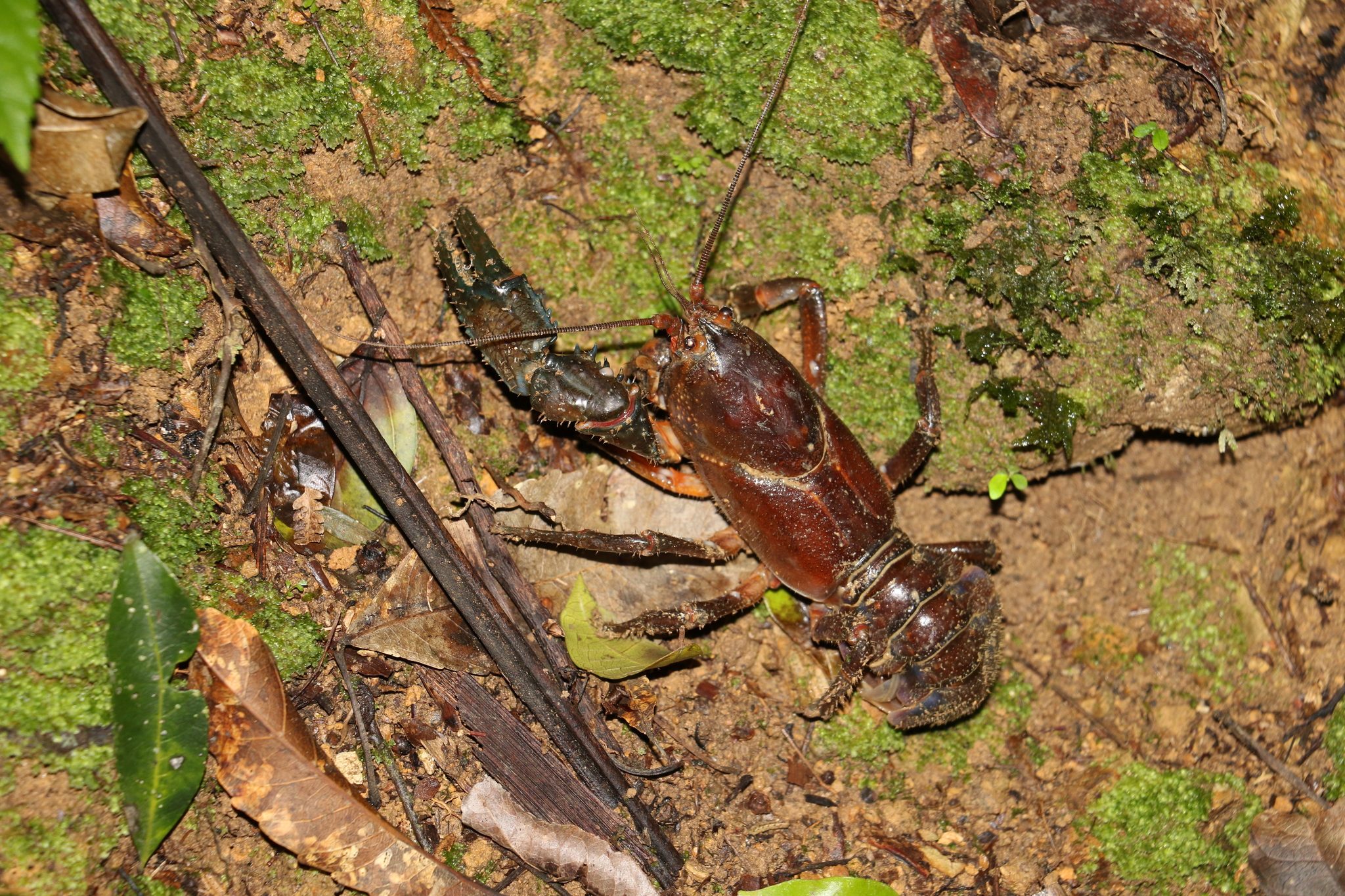

Conservation status
- Critically Endangered (IUCN 3.1)

Scientific classification
- Kingdom: Animalia
- Phylum: Arthropoda
- Class: Malacostraca
- Order: Decapoda
- Suborder: Pleocyemata
- Family: Parastacidae
- Genus: Euastacus
- Species: E. setosus

Binomial name
- Euastacus setosus (Riek, 1956)

= Euastacus setosus =

Species of crayfish

Euastacus setosus is a species of southern crawfish in the family Parastacidae.

The IUCN conservation status of Euastacus setosus is "CR", critically endangered. The species faces an extremely high risk of extinction in the immediate future. The IUCN status was reviewed in 2010. The species is found in only a couple of creek systems near Mount Glorious in the D'Aguilar Range of South East Queensland, Australia.

Listed as critically endangered JUNE 6 2025 under the Nature Conservation Act (Qld).
