= Euastacus monteithorum =

Conservation status
- Critically Endangered (IUCN 3.1)

Scientific classification
- Kingdom: Animalia
- Phylum: Arthropoda
- Class: Malacostraca
- Order: Decapoda
- Suborder: Pleocyemata
- Family: Parastacidae
- Genus: Euastacus
- Species: E. monteithorum

Binomial name
- Euastacus monteithorum Morgan, 1989

Species of crayfish

Euastacus monteithorum is a species of southern crawfish in the family Parastacidae.

The IUCN conservation status of Euastacus monteithorum is "CR", critically endangered. The species faces an extremely high risk of extinction in the immediate future. The IUCN status was reviewed in 2010.
