= Ceylonthelphusa sanguinea =

Conservation status
- Critically Endangered (IUCN 3.1)

Scientific classification
- Kingdom: Animalia
- Phylum: Arthropoda
- Clade: Pancrustacea
- Class: Malacostraca
- Order: Decapoda
- Suborder: Pleocyemata
- Infraorder: Brachyura
- Family: Gecarcinucidae
- Genus: Ceylonthelphusa
- Species: C. sanguinea

Binomial name
- Ceylonthelphusa sanguinea (Ng, 1995)

Species of crab

Ceylonthelphusa sanguinea is a species of decapod in the family Gecarcinucidae.

The IUCN conservation status of Ceylonthelphusa sanguinea is "CR", critically endangered. The species faces an extremely high risk of extinction in the immediate future. The IUCN status was reviewed in 2008.
