= Mahatha =

Scientific classification
- Kingdom: Animalia
- Phylum: Arthropoda
- Class: Malacostraca
- Order: Decapoda
- Suborder: Pleocyemata
- Infraorder: Brachyura
- Family: Gecarcinucidae
- Genus: Mahatha; Ng & Tay, 2001

Type species
- Mahatha adonis Ng & Tay, 2001

Species
- Mahatha adonis Ng & Tay, 2001; Mahatha helaya Bahir & Ng, 2005; Mahatha iora Ng & Tay, 2001; Mahatha lacuna Bahir & Ng, 2005; Mahatha ornatipes (Roux, 1915); Mahatha regina Bahir & Ng, 2005

Genus of crabs

Mahatha is a genus of freshwater crabs endemic to Sri Lanka. Four of the six species are critically endangered due to habitat loss, and two are listed as Least Concern on the IUCN Red List.

== Species ==
=== Mahatha adonis ===
Mahatha adonis is a widespread species, known from the Mahaweli Basin, Knuckles Massif and Monaragala. It is considered a species of Least Concern by the IUCN.

=== Mahatha helaya ===
Mahatha helaya is only known from its type locality, near Kalupahana on the main Colombo-Haputale road, and is therefore considered critically endangered by the IUCN. The specific epithet helaya comes from the Sinhalese word for an inhabitant of Sri Lanka.

=== Mahatha iora ===
Mahatha iora is only known from its type locality, near the Dunhinda Falls, and is therefore considered critically endangered by the IUCN.

=== Mahatha lacuna ===
Mahatha lacuna is only known from its type locality, near Galle, and is therefore considered critically endangered by the IUCN. The specific epithet lacuna, from the Latin for "hole", refers to the deep burrow in which the species was found.

=== Mahatha ornatipes ===
Mahatha ornatipes was originally described in 1915 by Roux as Paratelphusa ornatipes, and was later described as Ceylonthelphusa inflatissima Bott, 1970. It is widespread in the wet zone of Sri Lanka and is considered a species of Least Concern by the IUCN.

=== Mahatha regina ===
Mahatha regina is only known from its type locality, near Pundaluoya, and is therefore considered critically endangered by the IUCN. The specific epithet regina (Latin for "queen") refers to the species' "regal appearance".
