= Perbrinckia gabadagei =

Conservation status
- Critically endangered, possibly extinct (IUCN 3.1)

Scientific classification
- Kingdom: Animalia
- Phylum: Arthropoda
- Class: Malacostraca
- Order: Decapoda
- Suborder: Pleocyemata
- Infraorder: Brachyura
- Family: Gecarcinucidae
- Genus: Perbrinckia
- Species: P. gabadagei

Binomial name
- Perbrinckia gabadagei Bahir & Ng, 2005

Species of crab

Perbrinckia gabadagei is a species of freshwater crabs of the family Gecarcinucidae that is endemic to Sri Lanka. The species was once categorized as vulnerable by founders, but now considered to be critically endangered and probably extinct due to lack of recent evidences since 1996. The species first found from Adam's Peak area. It is very rarely found, and known to live under moist soil, and near water sources.
