= Ceylonthelphusa kotagama =

Conservation status
- Critically Endangered (IUCN 3.1)

Scientific classification
- Kingdom: Animalia
- Phylum: Arthropoda
- Class: Malacostraca
- Order: Decapoda
- Suborder: Pleocyemata
- Infraorder: Brachyura
- Family: Gecarcinucidae
- Genus: Ceylonthelphusa
- Species: C. kotagama

Binomial name
- Ceylonthelphusa kotagama (Bahir, 1998)

Species of crab

Ceylonthelphusa kotagama is a species of decapod in the family Gecarcinucidae.

The IUCN conservation status of Ceylonthelphusa kotagama is "CR", critically endangered. The species faces an extremely high risk of extinction in the immediate future. The IUCN status was reviewed in 2008.
