= Ceylonthelphusa savitriae =

Conservation status
- Critically Endangered (IUCN 3.1)

Scientific classification
- Kingdom: Animalia
- Phylum: Arthropoda
- Class: Malacostraca
- Order: Decapoda
- Suborder: Pleocyemata
- Infraorder: Brachyura
- Family: Gecarcinucidae
- Genus: Ceylonthelphusa
- Species: C. savitriae

Binomial name
- Ceylonthelphusa savitriae N.g.Bahir, 2005

Species of crab

Ceylonthelphusa savitriae is a species of decapod in the family Gecarcinucidae.

The IUCN conservation status of Ceylonthelphusa savitriae is "CR", critically endangered. The species faces an extremely high risk of extinction in the immediate future. The IUCN status was reviewed in 2008.
