= Perbrinckia enodis =

Conservation status
- Critically Endangered (IUCN 3.1)

Scientific classification
- Kingdom: Animalia
- Phylum: Arthropoda
- Class: Malacostraca
- Order: Decapoda
- Suborder: Pleocyemata
- Infraorder: Brachyura
- Family: Gecarcinucidae
- Genus: Perbrinckia
- Species: P. enodis

Binomial name
- Perbrinckia enodis (Kingsley, 1880)

Species of crab

Perbrinckia enodis is a species of crab in the family Gecarcinucidae.

The IUCN conservation status of Perbrinckia enodis is "CR", critically endangered. The species faces an extremely high risk of extinction in the immediate future.
