= Euastacus eungella =

Conservation status
- Critically Endangered (IUCN 3.1)

Scientific classification
- Kingdom: Animalia
- Phylum: Arthropoda
- Class: Malacostraca
- Order: Decapoda
- Suborder: Pleocyemata
- Family: Parastacidae
- Genus: Euastacus
- Species: E. eungella

Binomial name
- Euastacus eungella Morgan, 1988

Species of crayfish

Euastacus eungella is a species of southern crawfish in the family Parastacidae.

The IUCN conservation status of Euastacus eungella is "CR", critically endangered. The species faces an extremely high risk of extinction in the immediate future. The IUCN status was reviewed in 2010.
