= Perbrinckia punctata =

Conservation status
- Critically Endangered (IUCN 3.1)

Scientific classification
- Kingdom: Animalia
- Phylum: Arthropoda
- Class: Malacostraca
- Order: Decapoda
- Suborder: Pleocyemata
- Infraorder: Brachyura
- Family: Gecarcinucidae
- Genus: Perbrinckia
- Species: P. punctata

Binomial name
- Perbrinckia punctata Ng, 1995

Species of crab

Perbrinckia punctata is a species of crab belonging to the family Gecarcinucidae.

The IUCN conservation status of Perbrinckia punctata is "CR", critically endangered. The species faces an extremely high risk of extinction in the immediate future.
