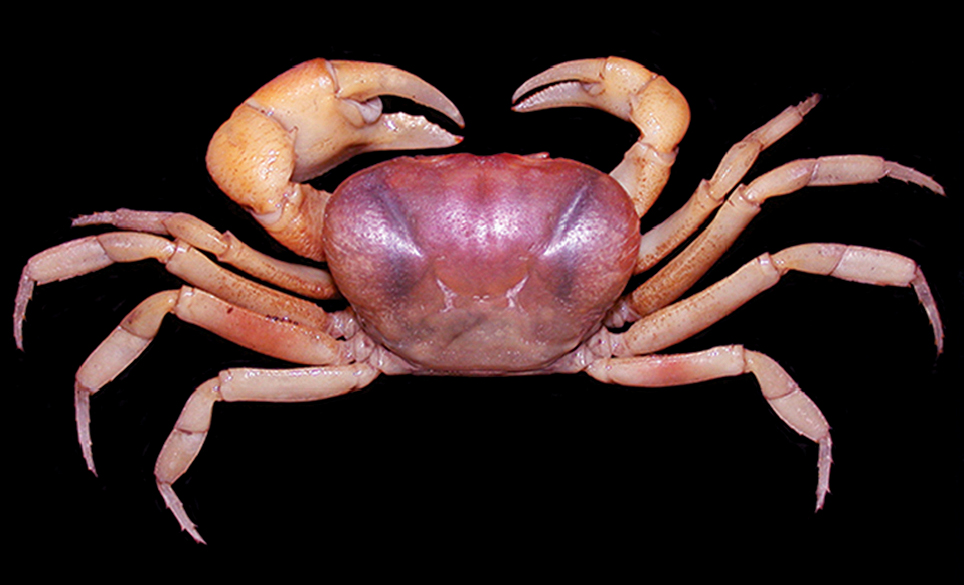

Scientific classification
- Kingdom: Animalia
- Phylum: Arthropoda
- Clade: Pancrustacea
- Class: Malacostraca
- Order: Decapoda
- Suborder: Pleocyemata
- Infraorder: Brachyura
- Family: Gecarcinucidae
- Subfamily: Parathelphusinae; Alcock, 1910

= Parathelphusinae =

Subfamily of crabs

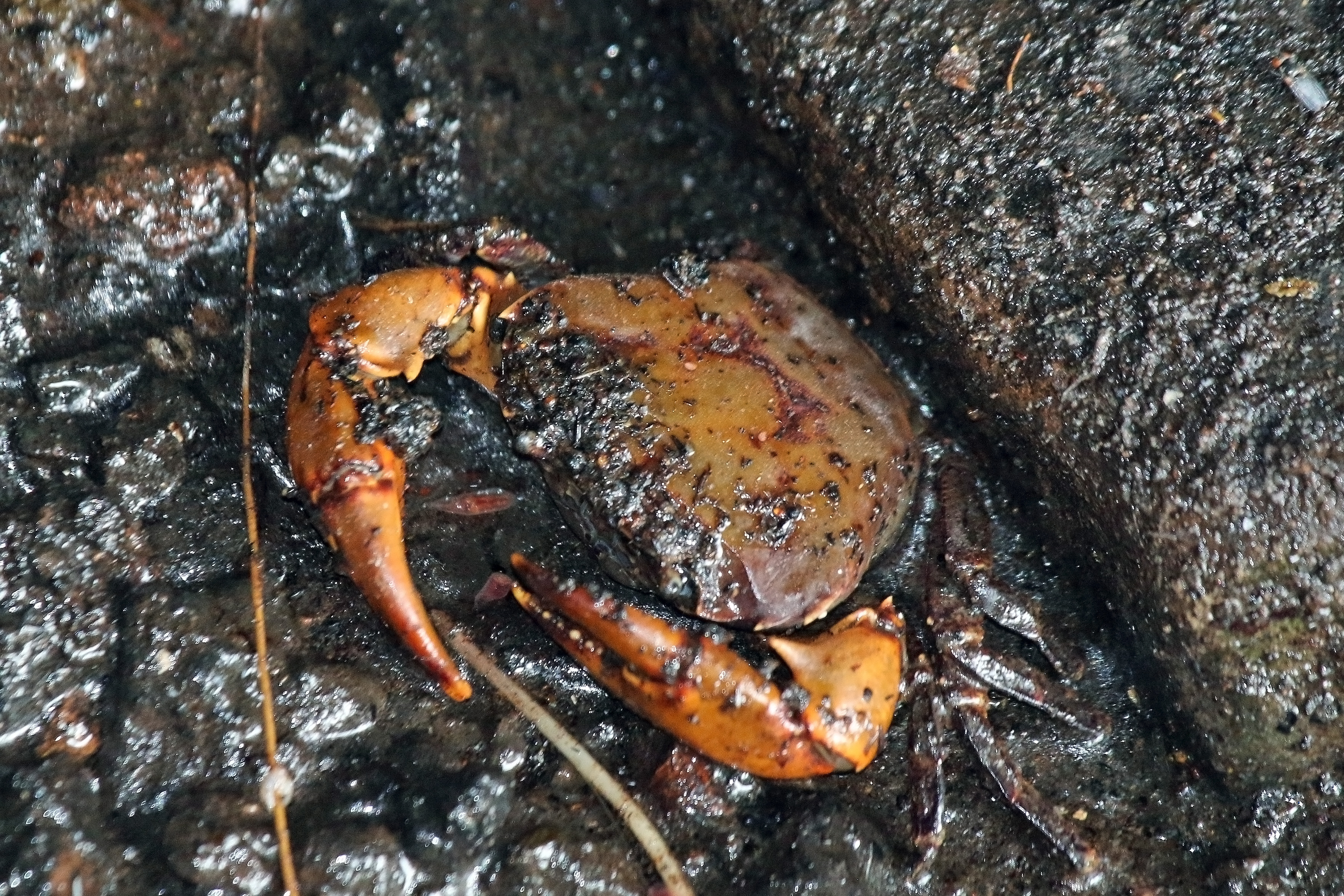
Arachnothelphusa rhadamanthysi Cave crab, Borneo

Parathelphusinae is a subfamily of freshwater crabs, which was formerly placed in the family Parathelphusidae; they are mainly found in South and Southeast Asia, but also found elsewhere in Asia and in Australia. The family is now considered as a junior synonym of the family Gecarcinucidae.

The Parathelphusinae inhabit rivers, lakes and rice paddies. Some species, for example from the genus Somanniathelphusa, are locally important as food, particularly in Thailand, Mizoram (India), etc. where they are an important ingredient in som tam. Some others are very rare and close to extinction such as the Parathelphusa reticulata, Singapore's Swamp Forest Crab.

Genera in this family are:

- Adelaena
- Arachnothelphusa
- Austrothelphusa
- Bakousa
- Bassiathelphusa
- Ceylonthelphusa
- Clinothelphusa
- Coccusa
- Currothelphusa
- Esanthelphusa
- Geelvinkia
- Geithusa
- Heterothelphusa
- Holthuisana
- Irmengardia
- Mahatha
- Mainitia
- Mekhongthelphusa
- Migmathelphusa
- Nautilothelphusa
- Niasathelphusa
- Oziotelphusa
- Parathelphusa
- Pastilla
- Perbrinckia
- Perithelphusa
- Rouxana
- Salangathelphusa
- Sartoriana
- Sayamia
- Sendleria
- Siamthelphusa
- Somanniathelphusa
- Spiralothelphusa
- Stygothelphusa
- Sundathelphusa
- Syntripsa
- Terrathelphusa
- Thelphusula
- Torhusa
