= Lake Poso =

Lake in Sulawesi, Indonesia

- Location within Indonesia Location within Sulawesi
- Location: Central Sulawesi, Indonesia
- Coordinates: 1°55′28″S 120°37′0″E
- Type: Tectonic
- Primary outflows: Poso River
- Catchment area: 1,811 km^{2} (699 sq mi)
- Basin countries: Indonesia
- Surface area: 323.2 km^{2} (124.8 sq mi)
- Average depth: 66.8 m (219 ft)
- Max. depth: 450 m (1,480 ft)
- Water volume: 21.6 km^{3} (5.2 cu mi)
- Shore length^{1}: 112 km (70 mi)
- Surface elevation: 485 m (1,591 ft)
- ^{1} Shore length is not a well-defined measure.

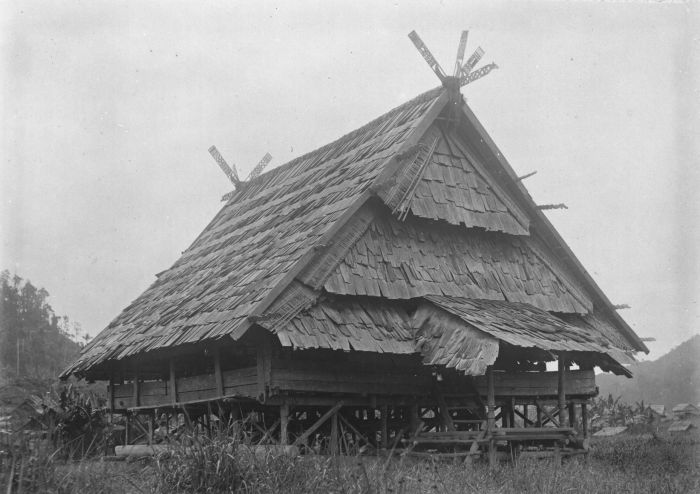
A Pamona spirit house south of Lake Poso

Lake Poso (Indonesian: Danau Poso) is a lake in Central Sulawesi, Indonesia, and the third-deepest lake in Indonesia.

The town of Pendolo is situated at the southern end of the lake, the town of Tentena is located at the northern end, while a number of smaller villages dot the shoreline. The lake drains into the Poso River at Tentena, which flows into the Molucca Sea at the town of Poso.

== Ecology ==
The lake contains various fish, including the eel Anguilla marmorata which migrates between the lake and the sea, and 11 fish species that are endemic to the lake, notably buntingi ricefish (Adrianichthys, Oryzias nebulosus, O. nigrimas and O. orthognathus), gobies (Mugilogobius amadi and M. sarasinorum), and the halfbeak Nomorhamphus celebensis. These endemics are all highly threatened; in some cases possibly already extinct. One of the reasons for the drastic decline of the native fish are introduced, non-native species, particularly Mozambique tilapia and common carp.

There is also a large number of endemic Tylomelania freshwater snails in the lake, as well as 11 endemic Caridina shrimps and Parathelphusid crabs (genera Migmathelphusa, Parathelphusa and Sundathelphusa).

A park containing wild orchids is located near the village Bancea on the lake. As well the forests surrounding the lake still provide rare sightings of the anoa (dwarf buffalo) and the babirusa (literally, pigdeer), a ruminant pig. These two endangered species are among a number of wildlife species found only on the island of Sulawesi.

== See also ==
- List of lakes of Indonesia
