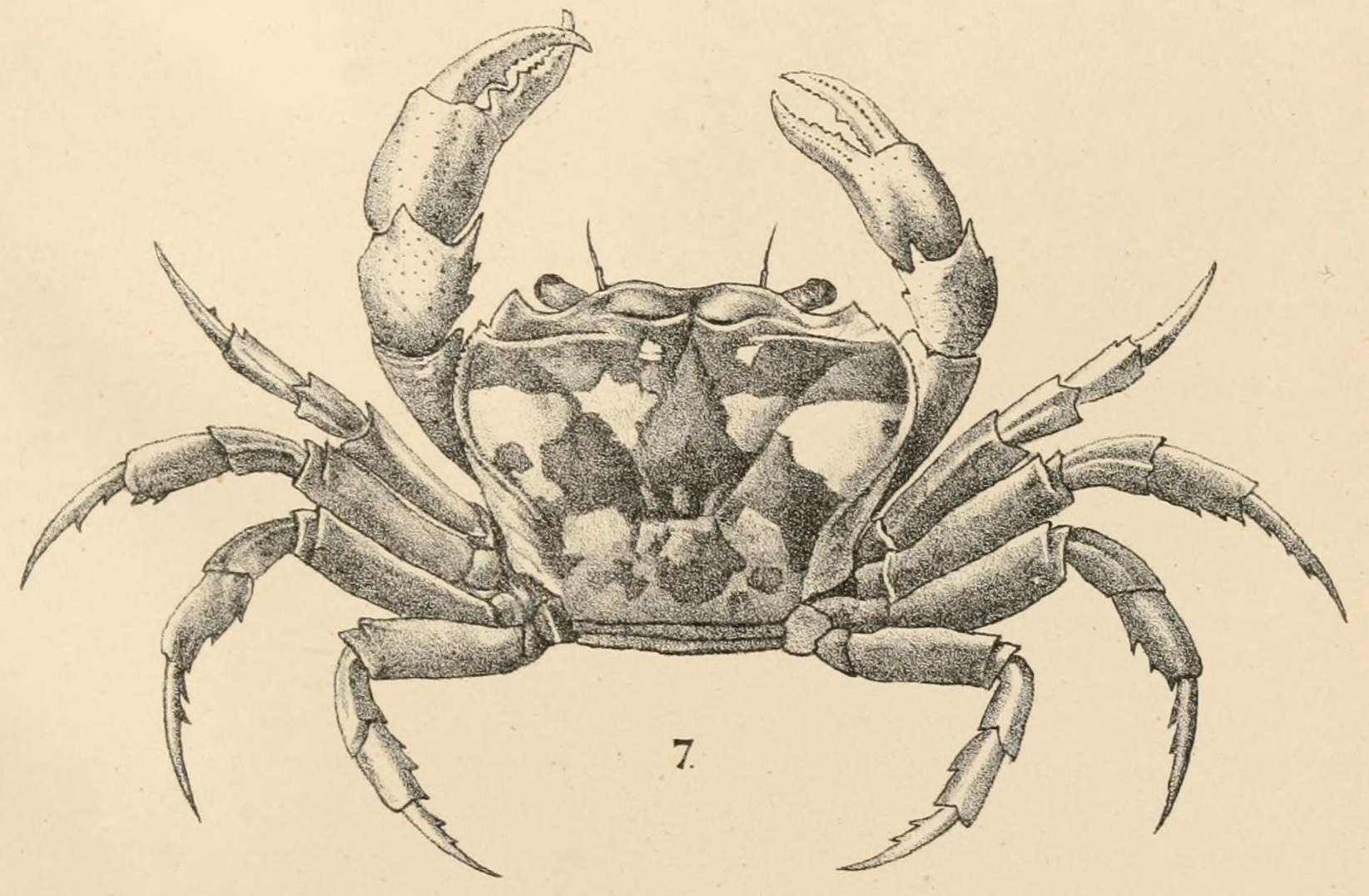
- O. hippocastanum
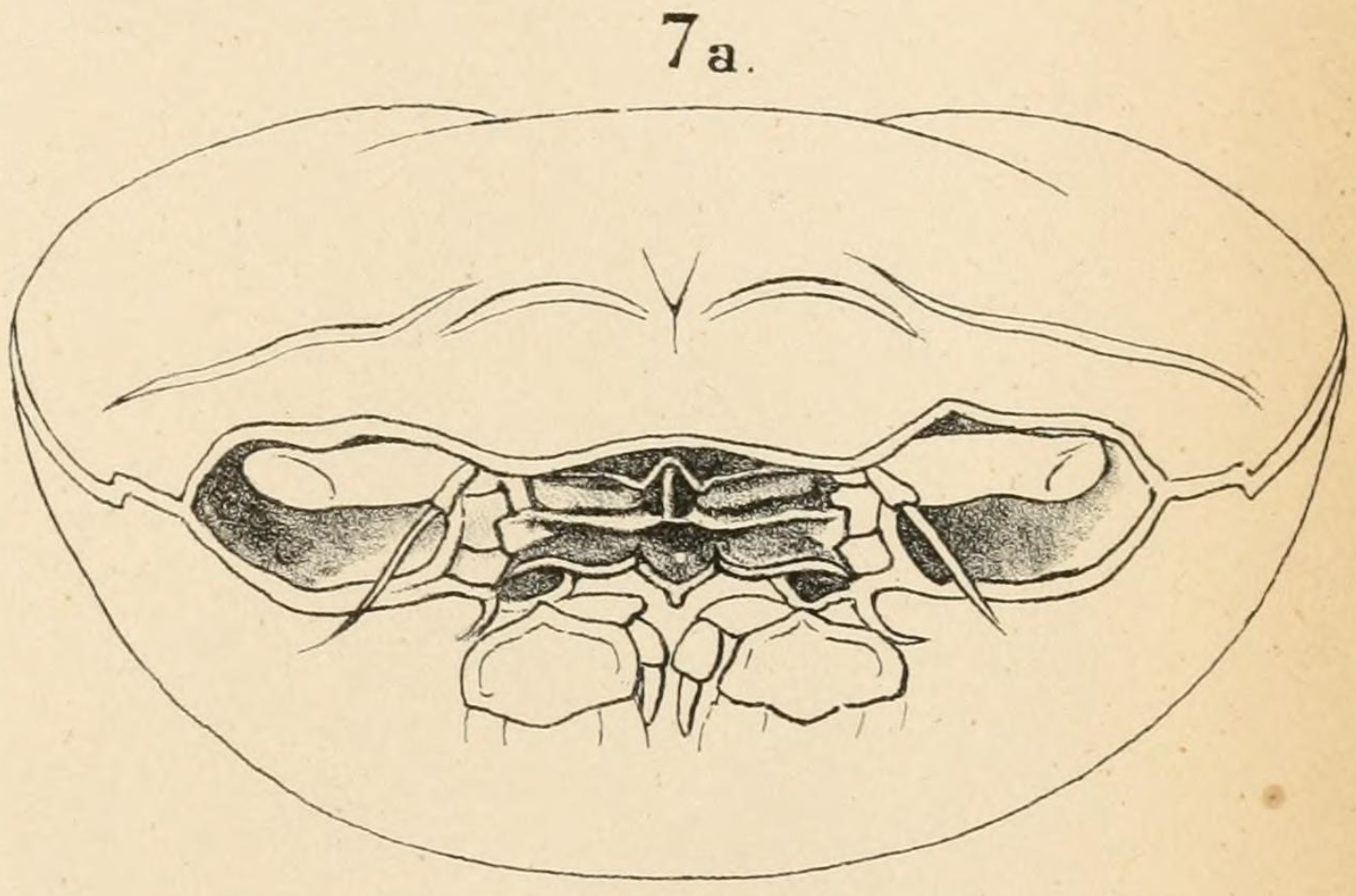
- Facial region

Conservation status
- Vulnerable (IUCN 3.1)

Scientific classification
- Kingdom: Animalia
- Phylum: Arthropoda
- Class: Malacostraca
- Order: Decapoda
- Suborder: Pleocyemata
- Infraorder: Brachyura
- Family: Gecarcinucidae
- Genus: Oziotelphusa
- Species: O. hippocastanum

Binomial name
- Oziotelphusa hippocastanum (Müller, 1887)

Synonyms
- Telphusa (Oziothelphusa) hippocastanum Müller, 1887; Potamon hippocastanum (Müller, 1887); Potamon (Potamon) hippocastanum (Müller, 1887); Parathelphusa hippocastanum (Müller, 1887)

= Oziotelphusa hippocastanum =

Species of crab

Oziotelphusa hippocastanum is a species of crustacean in the family Parathelphusidae. It is endemic to Sri Lanka. Its natural habitats are subtropical or tropical moist lowland forests, subtropical or tropical swamps, and rivers. It is threatened by habitat loss.
