= Oziotelphusa stricta =

Conservation status
- Vulnerable (IUCN 3.1)

Scientific classification
- Kingdom: Animalia
- Phylum: Arthropoda
- Class: Malacostraca
- Order: Decapoda
- Suborder: Pleocyemata
- Infraorder: Brachyura
- Family: Gecarcinucidae
- Genus: Oziotelphusa
- Species: O. stricta

Binomial name
- Oziotelphusa stricta Ng & Tay, 2001

Species of crab

Oziotelphusa stricta is a species of freshwater crabs in the family Gecarcinucidae. It is endemic to Sri Lanka. The species was initially categorized as Near Threatened by the finders, but recent observations included to vulnerable by IUCN Red List due to less abundance is observed localities and much restricted ecology.

== Ecology ==
The species can be found in many nature reserves in southern Sri Lanka, such as Ruhunu National Park, Knuckles Mountain Range and many other southernmost localities- Monaragala and Badulla areas.

== Description ==
The species is greatly similar to Oziotelphusa ceylonensis in their external morphology. So the two species are easily misidentified. The main difference is the straight G1 of male in O. stricta when compared to O. ceylonensis. The carapace is convex. Postorbital region slightly concave. Suture between thoracic sternites 2 and 3 are not clearly visible. Abdomen of the male is triangular-shaped and robust. The species can be found within deep embankments of paddy fields, where plenty of water flows and also in river banks.
