= Oziotelphusa minneriyaensis =

Conservation status
- Least Concern (IUCN 3.1)

Scientific classification
- Kingdom: Animalia
- Phylum: Arthropoda
- Class: Malacostraca
- Order: Decapoda
- Suborder: Pleocyemata
- Infraorder: Brachyura
- Family: Gecarcinucidae
- Genus: Oziotelphusa
- Species: O. minneriyaensis

Binomial name
- Oziotelphusa minneriyaensis (Bott, 1970)

Species of crab

Oziotelphusa minneriyaensis is a species of crustacean in family Parathelphusidae. It is endemic to Sri Lanka. Its natural habitats are subtropical or tropical moist lowland forests, subtropical or tropical swamps, and rivers. It is threatened by habitat loss.
