= Spiralothelphusa fernandoi =

Conservation status
- Endangered (IUCN 3.1)

Scientific classification
- Kingdom: Animalia
- Phylum: Arthropoda
- Clade: Pancrustacea
- Class: Malacostraca
- Order: Decapoda
- Suborder: Pleocyemata
- Infraorder: Brachyura
- Family: Gecarcinucidae
- Genus: Spiralothelphusa
- Species: S. fernandoi

Binomial name
- Spiralothelphusa fernandoi Ng, 1994

Species of crab

Spiralothelphusa fernandoi is a species of crab in the family Gecarcinucidae.

The IUCN conservation status of Spiralothelphusa fernandoi is "EN", endangered. The species faces a high risk of extinction in the near future. The IUCN status was reviewed in 2008.
