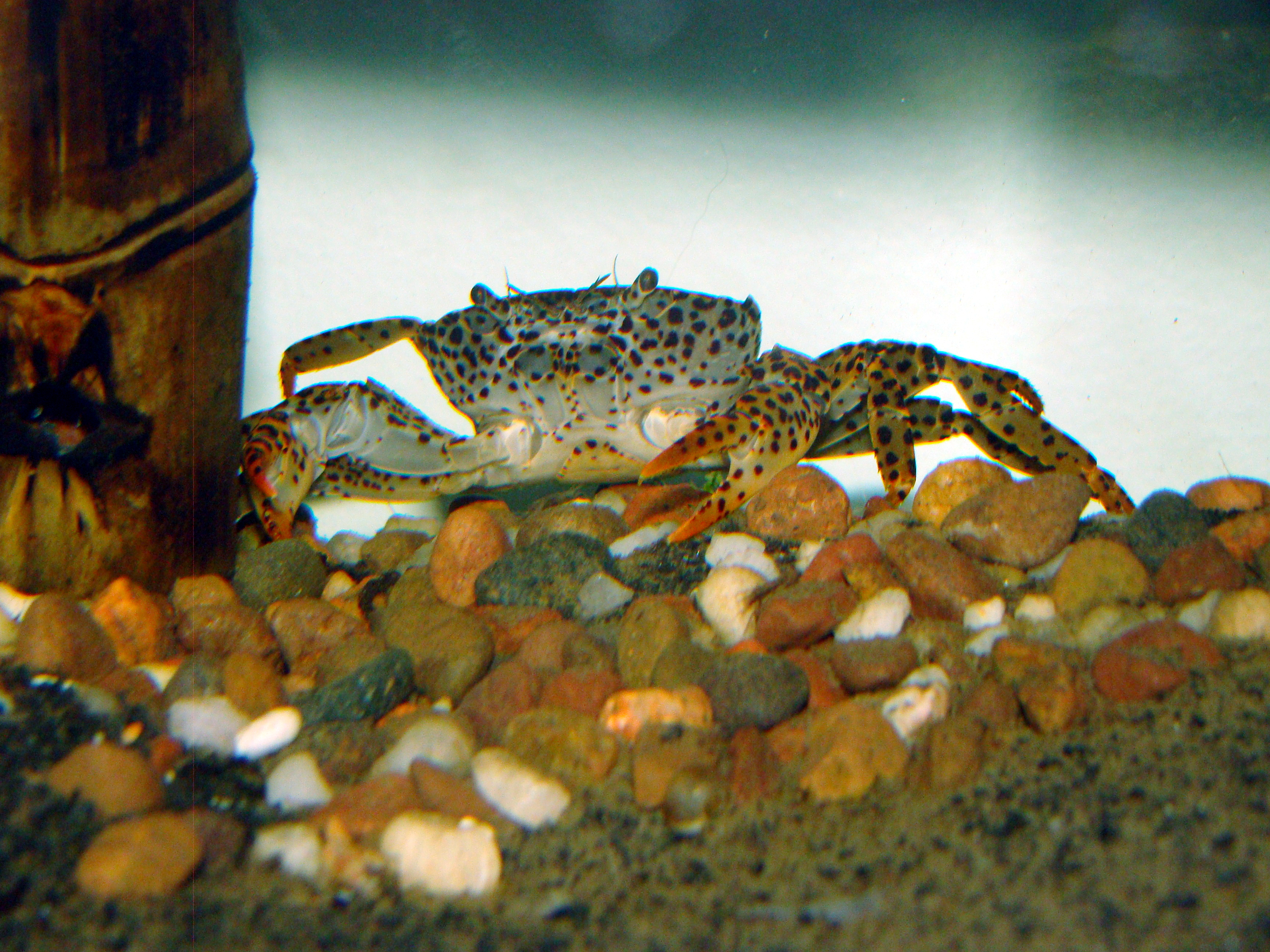

Conservation status
- Endangered (IUCN 3.1)

Scientific classification
- Kingdom: Animalia
- Phylum: Arthropoda
- Class: Malacostraca
- Order: Decapoda
- Suborder: Pleocyemata
- Infraorder: Brachyura
- Family: Gecarcinucidae
- Genus: Parathelphusa
- Species: P. pantherina

Binomial name
- Parathelphusa pantherina (Schenkel, 1902)

= Parathelphusa pantherina =

Species of crab

Parathelphusa pantherina, commonly known as the "panther crab", is a variety of freshwater crab from Indonesia from the family of the Gecarcinucidae . The scientific name of the species was published for the first time in 1902 by Schenkel. The species is categorized as Endangered by IUCN Red List due to damage to their habitat by mining of nickel from lake shores where they live, which negatively impacts their water quality.

The species is bought and sold by aquarium hobbyists.

== Ecology ==
The species can be found in the indonesian island of Sulawesi, specifically Lake Matano and areas south of the lake. Common to the lake as one of its five native freshwater crab species but exclusive to the island as a natural habitat, they can be found hiding under roots and logs. They reproduce by eggs, and can be found only in freshwater environments. A typical pH of Lake Matano, their home, is 7.4, while temperatures range between 27 and 31 degrees Celsius (approximately 80–88 degrees Fahrenheit).

== Description ==
The natural coloration of this crab is yellow to light orange, with dark-red rosettes extending from their flat carapace to the ambulatory legs. Often, they have red-tipped claws and legs, but may also show no red coloration.
