= Gubernatoriana triangulus =

Scientific classification
- Kingdom: Animalia
- Phylum: Arthropoda
- Class: Malacostraca
- Order: Decapoda
- Suborder: Pleocyemata
- Infraorder: Brachyura
- Family: Gecarcinucidae
- Genus: Gubernatoriana
- Species: G. triangulus

Binomial name
- Gubernatoriana triangulus (Pati and Sharma, 2014)

Species of crab

Gubernatoriana triangulus is a species of freshwater crab in the family Gecarcinucidae. The species is endemic to the Western Ghats in India.

== Etymology ==
Triangulus is the Latin word for "triangular". Gubernatoriana triangulus has a triangular G1 subterminal segment.

== Description ==
They have a brown carapace, and yellowish brown chelipeds and ambulatory legs.

== Distribution ==
Gubernatoriana triangulus's type locality is the Satara and Pune district of Maharashtra in the Western Ghats. It is endemic to this area.
