= Sahyadriana sahyadriensis =

Scientific classification
- Kingdom: Animalia
- Phylum: Arthropoda
- Clade: Pancrustacea
- Class: Malacostraca
- Order: Decapoda
- Suborder: Pleocyemata
- Infraorder: Brachyura
- Family: Gecarcinucidae
- Genus: Sahyadriana
- Species: S. sahyadriensis

Binomial name
- Sahyadriana sahyadriensis Pati & Thackeray, 2018

Species of true crab

Sahyadriana sahyadriensis is a species of true crab in the family Gecarcinucidae and the type species of the genus Sahyadriana. It was formally described in 2018, and is endemic to the Western Ghats.

== Taxonomy and etymology ==
The species was described by S.K. Pati and T. Thackeray in 2018. Thackeray collected the holotype from Navaja Tunnel, Koyna, Satara district, Maharashtra, India. The origin for both the genus name and the specific name is the Marathi word for the Western Ghats, "Sahyadri".

== Description ==
The carapace of the holotype is 8.26 milimeters long and 11.11 milimeters wide. The colors of this species varies. Typically, the carapace is a purplish brown and the legs are a reddish orange. A few specimens have purplish brown walking legs and reddish purple chelipeds (claw-bearing legs).

Sahyadriana sahyadriensis looks similar to S. billyarjani, but differs in the fifth and sixth abdominal somites, the edges of which are very close to straight in males. Additionally, the last segment of the first gonopod is longer. It also resembles S. inopinata, but the notch between the external orbital angle and the epibranchial tooth is not as pronounced, and the last segment of the first gonopod is shorter and thicker. The vulva of S. inopinata is also smaller and differently shaped.

== Habitat and distribution ==
Sahyadriana sahyadriensis is only known from the Western Ghats, specifically from three districts of Maharashtra, India: Satara, Kolhapur, and Ratnagiri. It lives on the cliffs of and at the base of ephemeral waterfalls.

== Ecology ==
The species is a crepuscular animal, and during the day stays in stony cracks.
