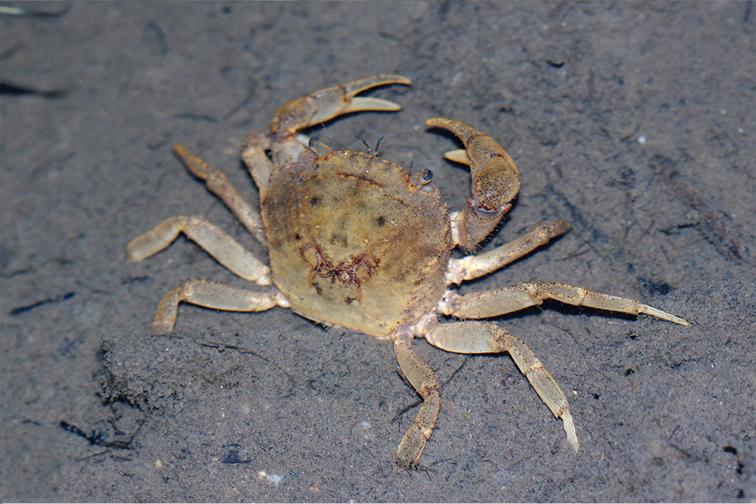

Conservation status
- Endangered (IUCN 3.1)

Scientific classification
- Kingdom: Animalia
- Phylum: Arthropoda
- Class: Malacostraca
- Order: Decapoda
- Suborder: Pleocyemata
- Infraorder: Brachyura
- Family: Gecarcinucidae
- Genus: Somanniathelphusa
- Species: S. zanklon

Binomial name
- Somanniathelphusa zanklon Ng & Dudgeon, 1992

= Somanniathelphusa zanklon =

Species of crab

Somanniathelphusa zanklon is a species of endangered freshwater crab considered to be endemic to Hong Kong.

== Ecology and behavior ==
The lifecycle of S. zanklon is similar to most true freshwater crabs, in which they brood over planktonic larvae, and release their juveniles at the onset of the rainy season.

It is naturally omnivorous, with records of it eating seeds of the Bauhinia variegata tree, as well as various species of freshwater snails.

It is preyed upon by both native wild carp, as well as invasive goldfish and tilapia, which have been introduced to their environment through human intervention.

== Habitat and range ==
It prefers living in slow moving streams or lowland marshes, was originally described from specimens from the lower Lam Tsuen River and the So Kwun Wat area of Hong Kong. Studies have shown that is tolerant to organic pollution, and can be found in irrigation ditches around the New Territories.

== Conservation ==
In 2019, a large population of S. zanklon was found at the site of further development of the Hong Kong Golf Club in Fanling. The Hong Kong branch of the World Wildlife Fund lobbied at the Environmental Protection Department to stop development of the site, due to the potential disruption of their native habitat.
