= Oziotelphusa ceylonensis =

Conservation status
- Least Concern (IUCN 3.1)

Scientific classification
- Kingdom: Animalia
- Phylum: Arthropoda
- Class: Malacostraca
- Order: Decapoda
- Suborder: Pleocyemata
- Infraorder: Brachyura
- Family: Gecarcinucidae
- Genus: Oziotelphusa
- Species: O. ceylonensis

Binomial name
- Oziotelphusa ceylonensis (Fernando, 1960)

Species of crustacean

Oziotelphusa ceylonensis is a species of freshwater crabs in the family Parathelphusidae. It is endemic to Sri Lanka. The species is not threatened in their habitats, where they observed to be survive well in man-made settlements as well. The species was discovered from nine localities around Kandy hills. The preferred habitats are embankments of paddy fields, where many irrigation canals constructed to provide continuous supply of water to the field.

== Description ==
The carapace is more convex. Postorbital region concave. Suture between thoracic sternites 2 and 3 are not clearly visible, where they can be seen as a groove without lateral borders. Abdomen of the male is much robust in shape and triangular.
