= Somanniathelphusa pax =

Scientific classification
- Kingdom: Animalia
- Phylum: Arthropoda
- Class: Malacostraca
- Order: Decapoda
- Suborder: Pleocyemata
- Infraorder: Brachyura
- Family: Gecarcinucidae
- Genus: Somanniathelphusa
- Species: S. pax

Binomial name
- Somanniathelphusa pax Ng & Kosuge, 1995

Species of crab

Somanniathelphusa pax is a species of crab that belongs to the family Gecarcinucidae. The species was first identified in 1995 in Vietnam.
