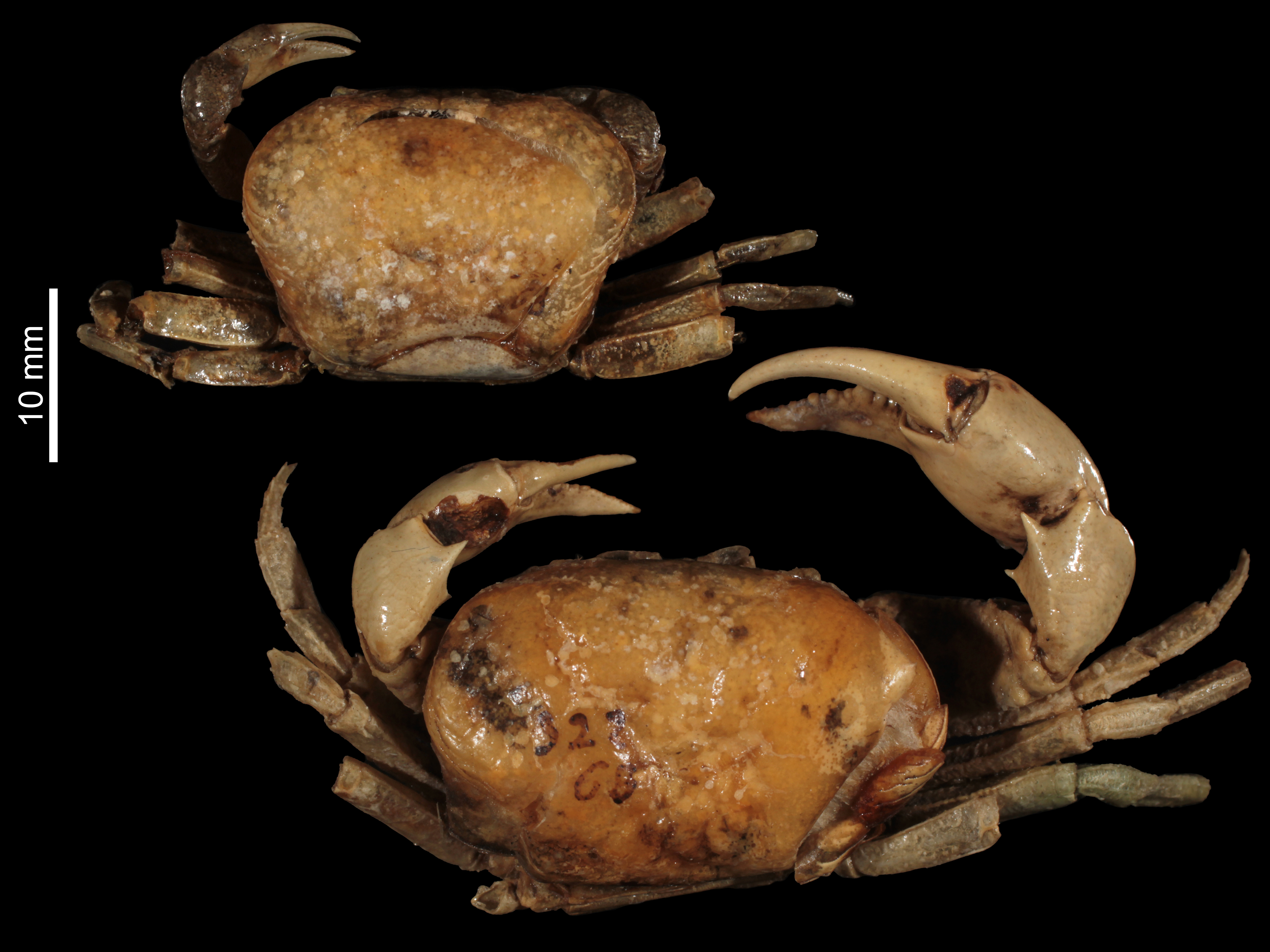
- Austrothelphusa transversa from Queensland

Conservation status
- Least Concern (IUCN 3.1)

Scientific classification
- Kingdom: Animalia
- Phylum: Arthropoda
- Clade: Pancrustacea
- Class: Malacostraca
- Order: Decapoda
- Suborder: Pleocyemata
- Infraorder: Brachyura
- Family: Gecarcinucidae
- Genus: Austrothelphusa
- Species: A. transversa

Binomial name
- Austrothelphusa transversa (von Martens, 1868)

Synonyms
- Telphusa crassa (Milne-Edwards, 1869); Telphusa leichardti (Miers, 1884)

= Austrothelphusa transversa =

Species of crustacean in Australia

Austrothelphusa transversa (von Martens, 1868), also known as the inland crab, freshwater crab, or tropical freshwater crab is a species of freshwater crab endemic to Australia. A. transversa is the most widely-dispersed species of its genus, as it has adaptations giving it a high tolerance to drought and arid conditions.

== Taxonomy and description ==
The inland crab has undergone numerous changes of specific name, changing genera, subgenera, and subfamilies, including Parathephusa, Liotelphusa, and Holthuisana. Due to the loss of type specimens, similarities between certain genera, and most recently molecular testing, the species is currently grouped with six other species in the genus Austrothelphusa. The coloration of the inland crab varies among individuals; most have a brown, maroon, and grey coloring to the exoskeleton, or a similar shade. The inland crab has a relatively smooth carapace which grows to around 5 cm (2.0 in) in diameter. Like other decapods, the inland crab has one pair of claws, one of which is longer than the other, four pairs of legs, and a relatively round carapace.

== Distribution and habitat ==
The inland crab is endemic to the Australian mainland and is widely distributed throughout the north-western half of the continent, living both in the arid inland conditions of central Australia as well as the tropical and sub-tropical rivers of northern Australia. The inland crab is predominantly found throughout ephemeral rivers, creeks, and waterholes throughout Queensland (QLD) and the Northern Territory (NT), whilst located in pockets in the north-eastern parts of Western Australia (WA) and South Australia (SA), and parts of north-western New South Wales (NSW).

== Behaviour ==
=== Aestivation ===
The inland crab is thought to estivate into the deep burrows in which the crab builds in clay or sediment banks as a way of dealing with prolonged droughts, waiting for the rain to restore the creeks, rivers, and water holes, allowing them to exit æstivation. The burrowing habit of the crab is vital for its survival, as it allows individuals to find a moist substrate, close to the water table, in which the animal æstivates during dry periods, similarly to the common yabby. The crab burrows average some 50–100 cm (20–39 in) in depth, and the entrance to the tunnel contains a plug, creating a chamber in which moisture remains trapped, preventing the crab from drying out. This prolongs the time the crab can remain in its burrow.

=== Diet ===
The return of water to ephemeral rivers in the wet season supports a temporary abundance of aquatic life, such as algae and fish. Though the inland crab is an omnivore, they feed primarily on algae that bloom when the water returns. However, the inland crab is an opportunistic scavenger, and will feed on any decaying animal matter it encounters.

=== Amphibious ===
The inland crab's modified gills work as lungs when exposed to the atmosphere, allowing the animals to become amphibious. This is a common trait among other crustacean species. This adaptation allows the inland crab to leave the water, helping it thermoregulate, as small pools of water can fluctuate widely in temperature and oxygenation throughout the day. If conditions become intolerable, the crab can leave the water and seek shelter among roots, leaf litter, and other debris.

=== Reproduction ===
The female crab carries between 100 to 350 fertilized eggs under her abdomen, which is tucked under the crab's thorax. The female holds on to her eggs and young throughout larval development, until the early juvenile stage. Then, the mother will disperse the young into the close surroundings, where they will fend for themselves. The mother crab is believed to hold onto her young during the æstivation period in the burrows, releasing the young crabs when she exits æstivation. This means that the young are protected through the most difficult part of the year, giving the young an optimal chance for success as the waterways refill.

== Conservation ==
Although considered to be of 'Least Concern' by the IUCN, the inland crab occurs in several protected areas, including Sturt National Park. Due to its wide distribution, the inland crab is seen as of 'Least Concern', but to what extent the species will remain at this level will depend on further studies. More recent studies predict that due to its wide distribution, it could be more species than originally estimated.

=== Threats ===
Urbanization and human modification to natural rivers are among the factors threatening the inland crab. Altering the natural flow of creeks, modifying the structure of their banks, especially replacing natural substrate with concrete channels, has a direct impact on the species' ability to burrow and æstivate. Along with prolonged drought, agriculture, and climate change, the inland crab will have to face even longer periods without water.
