= Esanthelphusa nani =

Scientific classification
- Kingdom: Animalia
- Phylum: Arthropoda
- Class: Malacostraca
- Order: Decapoda
- Suborder: Pleocyemata
- Infraorder: Brachyura
- Family: Gecarcinucidae
- Genus: Esanthelphusa
- Species: E. nani

Binomial name
- Esanthelphusa nani Naiyanetr, 1984

Species of crab

Esanthelphusa nani is a species of crab of the family Gecarcinucidae. Esanthelphusa nani lives in rice paddy fields.
