= Holthuisana festiva =

Conservation status
- Data Deficient (IUCN 3.1)

Scientific classification
- Domain: Eukaryota
- Kingdom: Animalia
- Phylum: Arthropoda
- Class: Malacostraca
- Order: Decapoda
- Suborder: Pleocyemata
- Infraorder: Brachyura
- Family: Gecarcinucidae
- Genus: Holthuisana
- Species: H. festiva

Binomial name
- Holthuisana festiva (Roux, 1911)

Species of crab

Holthuisana festiva is a species of freshwater crab in the family Gecarcinucidae. The species is endemic to New Guinea.
