= Oziotelphusa ritigala =

Conservation status
- Vulnerable (IUCN 3.1)

Scientific classification
- Kingdom: Animalia
- Phylum: Arthropoda
- Class: Malacostraca
- Order: Decapoda
- Suborder: Pleocyemata
- Infraorder: Brachyura
- Family: Gecarcinucidae
- Genus: Oziotelphusa
- Species: O. ritigala

Binomial name
- Oziotelphusa ritigala Bahir & Yeo, 2005

Species of crab

Oziotelphusa ritigala is a species of freshwater crabs in the family Gecarcinucidae. It is endemic to Sri Lanka. The species is categorized as vulnerable by IUCN Red List due to less abundance is observed localities and much restricted ecology.

== Etymology ==
The specific name ritigala is due to their described locality Ritigala of North Central dry zone of Sri Lanka.

== Description ==
The carapace is convex. Postorbital region slightly concave. Suture between thoracic sternites 2 and 3 are clearly visible as a shallow groove not reaching to lateral borders. Abdomen of the male is T-shaped where sixth abdominal segment is square-shaped. The species can be found within deep embankments of paddy fields, where plenty of water flows.
