= Oziotelphusa intuta =

Scientific classification
- Kingdom: Animalia
- Phylum: Arthropoda
- Class: Malacostraca
- Order: Decapoda
- Suborder: Pleocyemata
- Infraorder: Brachyura
- Family: Gecarcinucidae
- Genus: Oziotelphusa
- Species: O. intuta

Binomial name
- Oziotelphusa intuta Bahir & Yeo, 2005

Species of crab

Oziotelphusa intuta is a species of crab in the family Gecarcinucidae.
