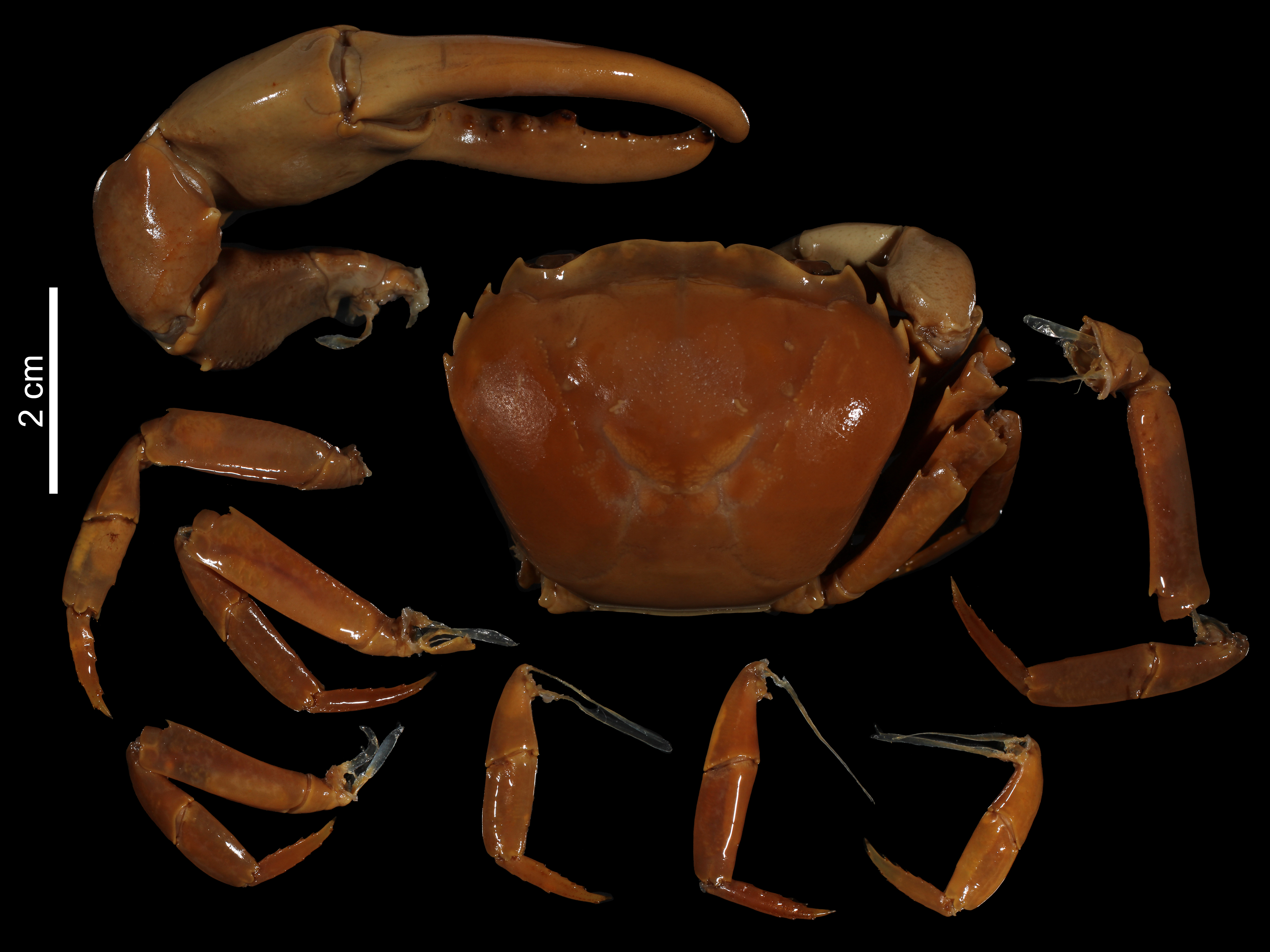

Scientific classification
- Kingdom: Animalia
- Phylum: Arthropoda
- Class: Malacostraca
- Order: Decapoda
- Suborder: Pleocyemata
- Infraorder: Brachyura
- Family: Gecarcinucidae
- Genus: Esanthelphusa
- Species: E. dugasti

Binomial name
- Esanthelphusa dugasti Rathbun, 1902

= Esanthelphusa dugasti =

Species of crab

Esanthelphusa dugasti is a species of crab that belongs to the family Gecarcinucidae. Esanthelphusa dugasti lives in India, Myanmar, Cambodia, Laos, Vietnam, and Thailand. People in northern Thailand rely on Esanthelphusa dugasti as a source of protein.
