= Esanthelphusa nimoafi =

Scientific classification
- Kingdom: Animalia
- Phylum: Arthropoda
- Class: Malacostraca
- Order: Decapoda
- Suborder: Pleocyemata
- Infraorder: Brachyura
- Family: Gecarcinucidae
- Genus: Esanthelphusa
- Species: E. nimoafi

Binomial name
- Esanthelphusa nimoafi Yeo, 2004

Species of crab

Esanthelphusa nimoafi is a species of crab of the family Gecarcinucidae. The crab is native to Laos.
