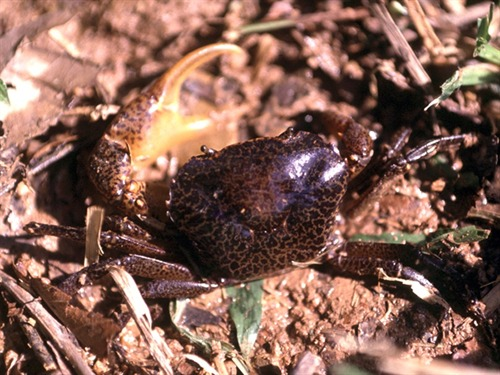

Conservation status
- Critically Endangered (IUCN 3.1)

Scientific classification
- Kingdom: Animalia
- Phylum: Arthropoda
- Clade: Pancrustacea
- Class: Malacostraca
- Order: Decapoda
- Suborder: Pleocyemata
- Infraorder: Brachyura
- Family: Gecarcinucidae
- Genus: Parathelphusa
- Species: P. reticulata

Binomial name
- Parathelphusa reticulata Ng, 1990

= Parathelphusa reticulata =

Swamp Forest Crab

Species of crab endemic to Singapore

Parathelphusa reticulata, the swamp forest crab is a critically endangered species of freshwater crab endemic to Singapore. It grows to a size of 40 mm (1.6 in).

== Ecology ==
Parathelphusa reticulata inhabits freshwater swamp forests with water of low pH (5.0 - 5.5). It digs burrows by the side of muddy banks, and is highly secretive, only active nocturnally. It feeds on plant matter predominantly, but also scavenges for animal matter when the opportunity arises.

== Distribution ==
Parathelphusa reticulata only lives in Singapore, and has only ever been recorded in Nee Soon Swamp Forest. However, since 2019 researchers have successfully bred two generations of the crab. And has released 20 of them into the wild at a new, undisclosed nature park, with the rest of the crabs released into Nee Soon Swamp Forest.

== Conservation ==
Efforts are ongoing to introduce Parathelphusa reticulata to different areas in Singapore. With researchers successfully breeding two generations of the crab since 2019, releasing 20 of them into a new, different, undisclosed nature park. It is part of a larger plan to conserve Singapore's biodiversity, which in turn helps combat global warming. Currently, more than 120 plant and animal species are under the recovery initiative. The Singaporean National Park Board is looking to grow this number to 160 by 2030.

== Threats ==
Due to Parathelphusa reticulata only being found within a 20 ha (49 acres) area within Nee Soon Swamp Forest, it is extremely vulnerable to habitat deterioration.
