= Patithelphusa =

Scientific classification
- Kingdom: Animalia
- Phylum: Arthropoda
- Clade: Pancrustacea
- Class: Malacostraca
- Order: Decapoda
- Suborder: Pleocyemata
- Infraorder: Brachyura
- Family: Gecarcinucidae
- Genus: Patithelphusa; Mitra et al., 2025
- Species: P. yercaudensis

Binomial name
- Patithelphusa yercaudensis Mitra et al., 2025

Genus of crabs

Patithelphusa is a genus of freshwater crabs in the family Gecarcinucidae and subfamily Parathelphusinae. This is a newly reported genus from Southeast Asia. The new genus of Gecarcinucid freshwater crab, is described from the Servarayan Hills (Eastern Ghats), Yercaud of Salem District, Tamil Nadu. This genus has been newly erected with a single species, Patithelphusa yercaudensis which is closely related to the genera, Baratha (Bahir & Yeo, 2007) and Travancoriana (Bott, 1969). This species is morphologically differentiated from its close relatives based on the carapace which is broader in this species. The unique male reproductive structure and triangular lobes are other distinct characters.

== Etymology ==
The genus was named to honour an Indian freshwater crab taxonomist Sameer Kumar Pati for his contribution.
