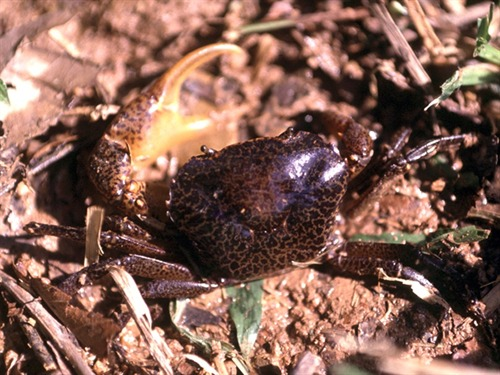
- Parathelphusa reticulata in Singapore, photograph taken by Peter Ng

Scientific classification
- Kingdom: Animalia
- Phylum: Arthropoda
- Class: Malacostraca
- Order: Decapoda
- Suborder: Pleocyemata
- Infraorder: Brachyura
- Family: Gecarcinucidae
- Subfamily: Parathelphusinae
- Genus: Parathelphusa; H. Milne Edwards, 1853

= Parathelphusa =

Genus of crabs

Parathelphusa is a genus of freshwater crabs in the family Gecarcinucidae and subfamily Parathelphusinae, primarily distributed across Southeast Asia, including countries such as Indonesia, the Philippines, and Singapore. Southeast Asia has some of the highest diversity of freshwater crabs around the world. Some species in this genus are endemic to Singapore, such as the critically endangered Parathelphusa reticulata (swamp forest crab) which became more well-known after its feature on a series of crab stamps by the Singapore Philatelic Bureau in 1992.

This genus comprises over 49 recognised species, with notable diversity in morphology and habitat preferences. For example, the Parathelphusa reticulata gets up to 4cm in size and lives in the swamp forest habitat, while the Parathelphusa maculata gets up to 6cm in size and lives in streams and nature reserves. The Parathelphusa pantherina (panther crab) is known for its striking colouration, with a patterned carapace resembling a panther's spots.

Despite their ecological importance, many species of Parathelphusa face the threats of habitat destruction, pollution, and excessive harvesting. For instance, Parathelphusa reticulata is critically endangered due to habitat loss in Singapore's swamp forests. Conservation efforts, including ex-situ breeding programs, are vital to preserving these unique freshwater crabs and their ecosystems.

== Taxonomy ==
Parathelphusa is a genus of freshwater crabs classified under the subfamily Parathelphusinae within the family Gecarcinucidae. The genus was erected by Henri Milne Edwards in Mémoire sur la famille des ocypodiens in 1853, with Parathelphusa tridentata designated as its type species by Mary Jane Rathbun (1905). The genus was gendered feminine.

The following distinctive traits characterise the genus: It has a transverse, smooth carapace with its length almost as long as its width. It has a triangularly-shaped median lobe on its rear margin of epistome. Its anterolateral edges have several teeth. Males have a T-shaped abdomen and exhibit sexual dimorphism, with larger chelae used for territorial behaviour.

Initially, taxonomic revisions by R. Bott (1970) recognised 10 species in Sulawesi alone, but subsequent studies expanded this to 47 species distributed across Southeast Asia, including Sulawesi, Bali, Lombok, and parts of Philippines. Today, there are 49 recognised species under this genus.

The list of recognised species are:

1. Parathelphusa balabac Ng & Takeda, 1993
2. Parathelphusa batamensis Ng, 1992
3. Parathelphusa baweanensis Ng, 1997
4. Parathelphusa bogorensis Bott, 1970
5. Parathelphusa cabayugan Freitag & Yeo, 2004
6. Parathelphusa celebensis (De Man, 1892)
7. Parathelphusa ceophallus Ng, 1993
8. Parathelphusa convexa De Man, 1879
9. Parathelphusa crocea (Schenkel, 1902)
10. Parathelphusa ferruginea Chia & Ng, 2006
11. Parathelphusa linduensis (Roux, 1904)
12. Parathelphusa lokaensis (De Man, 1892)
13. Parathelphusa lombokensis Bott, 1970
14. Parathelphusa maculata De Man, 1879
15. Parathelphusa maindroni (Rathbun, 1902)
16. Parathelphusa malaysiana Ng & Takeda, 1992
17. Parathelphusa manguao Freitag & Yeo, 2004
18. Parathelphusa mindoro Ng & Takeda, 1993
19. Parathelphusa modiglianii Nobili, 1903
20. Parathelphusa nagasakti Ng, 1988
21. Parathelphusa nana Ng & Takeda, 1993
22. Parathelphusa nitida Ng, 1986
23. Parathelphusa nobilii Ng, 2014
24. Parathelphusa obtusa (Bott, 1969)
25. Parathelphusa ovum Ng, 1995
26. Parathelphusa oxygona Nobili, 1901
27. Parathelphusa palawanensis (Bott, 1969)
28. Parathelphusa pallida (Schenkel, 1902)
29. Parathelphusa pantherina (Schenkel, 1902)
30. Parathelphusa pardus Ng, Rihki Riady & Windarti, 2016
31. Parathelphusa pareparensis (De Man, 1892)
32. Parathelphusa parma Ng & Takeda, 1993
33. Parathelphusa possoensis (Roux, 1904)
34. Parathelphusa pulcherrima (De Man, 1902)
35. Parathelphusa quadrata Ng, 1997
36. Parathelphusa rasilis Ng & Takeda, 1993
37. Parathelphusa reticulata Ng, 1990
38. Parathelphusa sabari Ng, 1986
39. Parathelphusa saginata Ng & Takeda, 1993
40. Parathelphusa sarasinorum (Schenkel, 1902)
41. Parathelphusa sarawakensis Ng, 1986
42. Parathelphusa shelfordi Nobili, 1901
43. Parathelphusa sorella Chia & Ng, 2006
44. Parathelphusa tenuipes (Schenkel, 1902)
45. Parathelphusa tera Chia & Ng, 1998
46. Parathelphusa torta Chia & Ng, 1998
47. Parathelphusa tridentata H. Milne Edwards, 1853
48. Parathelphusa undulata Chia & Ng, 1998
49. Parathelphusa valida Ng & Goh, 1987

== Distribution ==
According to the Global Biodiversity Information Facility (GBIF), there have been 996 known occurrences of Parathelphusa between 1841–2025. This map shows how these occurrences are distributed globally:

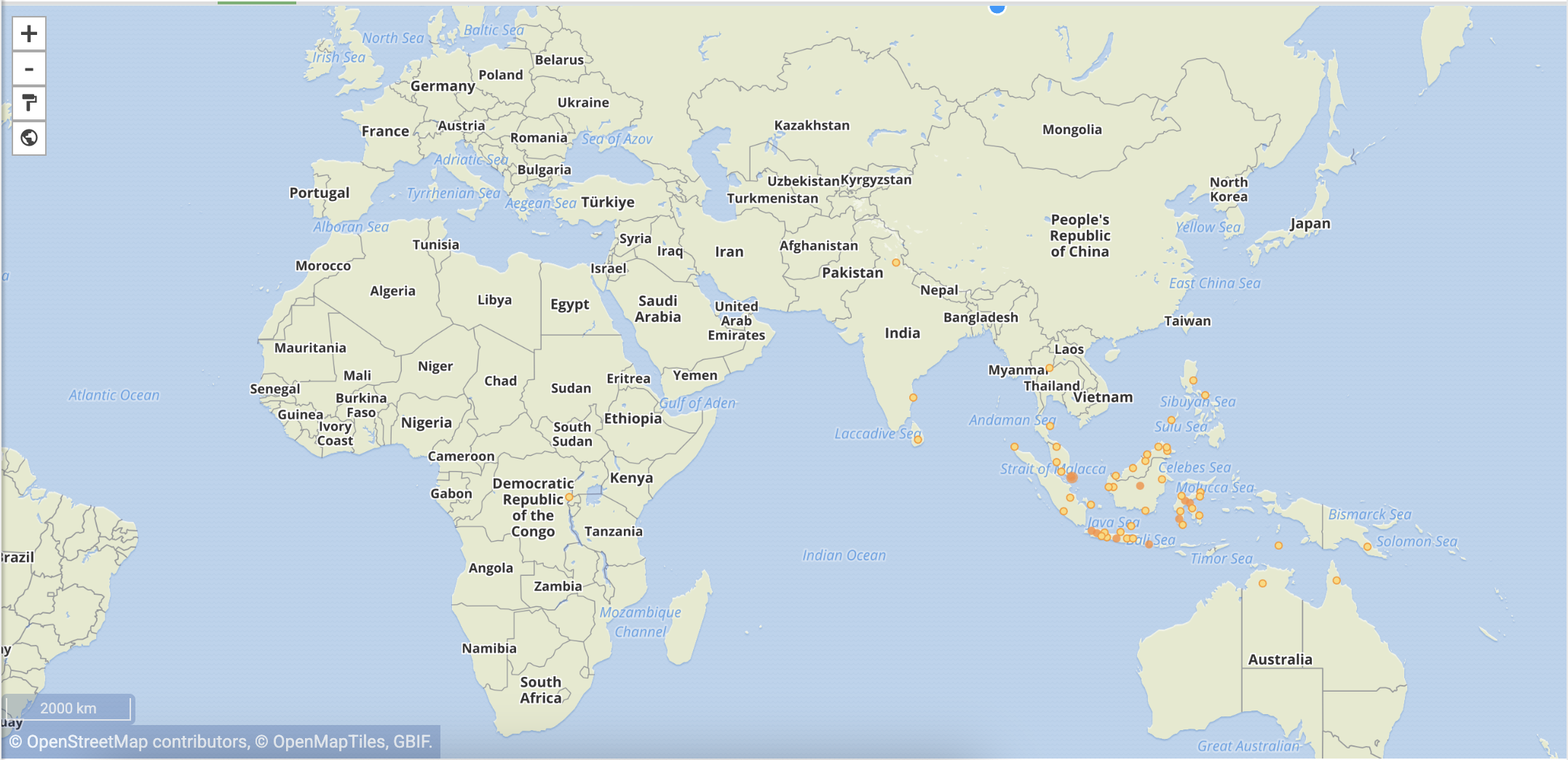
Distribution of Parathelphusa, accessed from GBIF on 8 April 2025.

== Evolution and phylogenetics ==
Parathelphusinae, now a subfamily of Gecarcinucidae, originated from Southeast Asian ancestors that dispersed to the Indian subcontinent during the Eocene via temporary land bridges, later recolonising mainland Asia and Australasia after the India-Asia collision. This biogeographic history underscores the genus's evolutionary adaptability to freshwater habitats. The genus remains a focus of taxonomic refinement due to its morphological convergence and cryptic diversity.

The Parathelphusa has several allied genera across Southeast Asia, including Nautilothelphusa (species includes Nautilothelphusa zimmeri), Migmathelphusa (species includes Migmathelphusa olivacea), Syntripsa (species includes Syntripsa flavichela and Syntripsa matannensis), and Sunathelphusa (species includes Sundathelphusa cassiope, Sundathelphusa rubra and Sundathelphusa minahassae).

The Parathelphusa has had a history of synonymised names:

Synonym	Proposed by	Status of synonym
Palawanthelphusa	Bott, 1969	Unaccepted, name considered as a junior subjective synonym.
Paratelphusa	H. Milne Edwards, 1853	Unaccepted, name considered a subsequent misspelling.
Paratelphusa (Mesotelphusa)	Roux, 1915	Unaccepted, name considered as a junior subjective synonym.
Paratelphusa (Paratelphusa)	H. Milne Edwards, 1853	Unaccepted, name considered a subsequent misspelling.
Parathelphusa (Mesotelphusa)	Roux, 1915	Unaccepted, name considered as a junior subjective synonym.
Parathelphusa (Parathelphusa)	H. Milne Edwards, 1853	Unaccepted. This is an old classification which has been superseded by Parathelphusa.
Parathephusa	H. Milne Edwards, 1853	Unaccepted, name considered a subsequent misspelling.
Potamon (Paratelphusa)	H. Milne Edwards, 1853	Unaccepted. This is an old classification which has been superseded by Parathelphusa.
Potamon (Parathelphusa)	H. Milne Edwards, 1853	Unaccepted. The classification of Parathelphusa under Potamon was once valid, but it was later changed due to new understanding.
Telphusa (Paratelphusa)	H. Milne Edwards, 1853	Unaccepted, name considered a subsequent misspelling.

== Behaviour ==
Members of Parathelphusa are commonly found in rivers, streams, lakes, and rice paddies, where they play ecological roles as scavengers and predators. These crabs exhibit omnivorous feeding habits, consuming plant material, detritus, and small invertebrates. Some species, such as Parathelphusa reticulata, are adapted to acidic freshwater environments with slow water flow. Others, like Parathelphusa convexa, are known as "the farmer's pest" due to their burrowing behaviour and impact on agriculture by damaging rice plants and paddy field bunds.

Reproductive biology in the study of Parathelphusa reticulata exhibited maternal care, where females brood fertilised eggs under their abdomen until they hatch directly into juvenile crabs. This adaptation bypasses the larval stage typical of marine crabs and is crucial for survival in freshwater habitats. Post-hatching maternal care increases the survival rate of crablets.
