= Somanniathelphusa lacuvita =

Scientific classification
- Kingdom: Animalia
- Phylum: Arthropoda
- Class: Malacostraca
- Order: Decapoda
- Suborder: Pleocyemata
- Infraorder: Brachyura
- Family: Gecarcinucidae
- Genus: Somanniathelphusa
- Species: S. lacuvita

Binomial name
- Somanniathelphusa lacuvita Ng, 1995

Species of crab

Somanniathelphusa lacuvita is a species of crab that belongs to the family Gecarcinucidae. The species was first found in Cambodia. The crab is found in rice paddies. When undercooked, it can transmit lung flukes to humans.
