= Syntripsa flavichela =

Conservation status
- Endangered (IUCN 3.1)

Scientific classification
- Kingdom: Animalia
- Phylum: Arthropoda
- Class: Malacostraca
- Order: Decapoda
- Suborder: Pleocyemata
- Infraorder: Brachyura
- Family: Gecarcinucidae
- Genus: Syntripsa
- Species: S. flavichela

Binomial name
- Syntripsa flavichela Chia & Ng, 2006

Species of crab

Syntripsa flavichela is a species of freshwater crab found in Lake Towuti and Lake Mahalona on the Indonesian island of Sulawesi.
