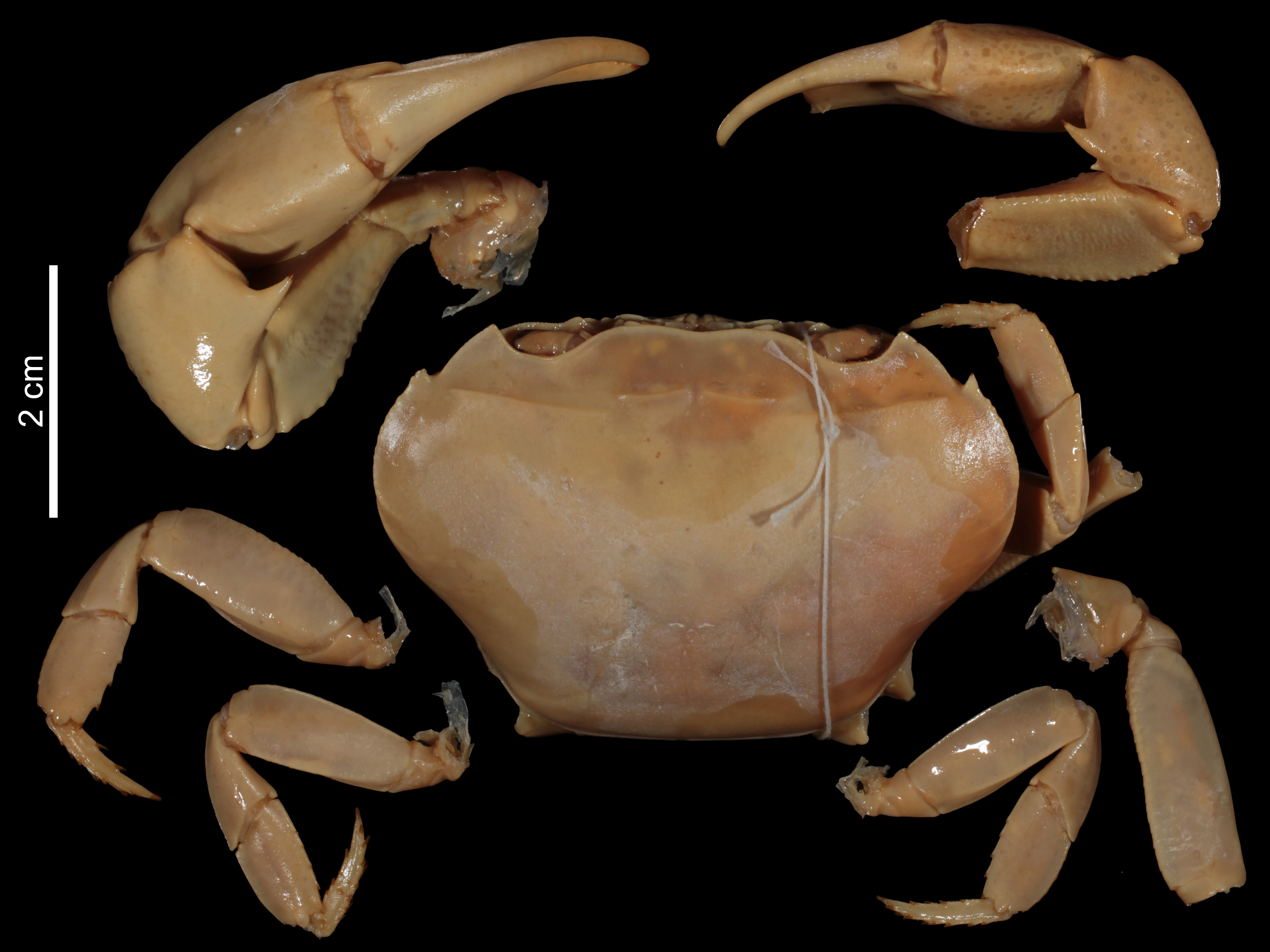
- Oziotelphusa bouvieri

Scientific classification
- Kingdom: Animalia
- Phylum: Arthropoda
- Class: Malacostraca
- Order: Decapoda
- Suborder: Pleocyemata
- Infraorder: Brachyura
- Family: Gecarcinucidae
- Genus: Oziotelphusa; Müller, 1887

Type species
- Telphusa hippocastanum Müller, 1887

= Oziotelphusa =

Genus of crabs

Oziotelphusa is a genus of freshwater crabs in the family Gecarcinucidae. Its members are found in Sri Lanka and southern India (throughout Kerala and Tamil Nadu and in the southern part of Karnataka). The genus was formerly placed within family Parathelphusidae, but now it is accepted that Parathelphusidae is the junior synonym of Gecarcinucidae.

The genus Oziotelphusa contains fifteen species, all of which are included on the IUCN Red List (LC: least concern; VU: vulnerable; EN: endangered; CR: critically endangered; DD: data deficient):

Species	Authority	Year	Distribution	IUCN status	Notes
Oziotelphusa aurantia	(Herbst)	1799	India (Tamil Nadu)	DD	known only from the type specimen
Oziotelphusa biloba	Bahir & Yeo	2005	India (Kerala)	VU	Kodagara and Koratti villages
Oziotelphusa bouvieri	(Rathbun)	1904	India (Tamil Nadu)	DD	only known from type locality
Oziotelphusa ceylonensis	(Fernando)	1960	Sri Lanka	LC	nine localities
Oziotelphusa dakuna	Bahir & Yeo	2005	Sri Lanka	EN	only known from 1 or 2 locations
Oziotelphusa gallicola	Bahir & Yeo	2005	Sri Lanka	EN	around Galle
Oziotelphusa hippocastanum	(Müller)	1887	Sri Lanka	VU	
Oziotelphusa intuta	Bahir & Yeo	2005	Sri Lanka	CR	only known from type locality
Oziotelphusa kerala	Bahir & Yeo	2005	India (Kerala)	DD	known only from the type specimen
Oziotelphusa kodagoda	Bahir & Yeo	2005	Sri Lanka	CR	only known from type locality
Oziotelphusa mineriyaensis	Bott	1970	Sri Lanka	LC	two localities: Minneriya and Anuradhapura
Oziotelphusa populosa	Bahir & Yeo	2005	Sri Lanka	EN	two localities
Oziotelphusa ritigala	Bahir & Yeo	2005	Sri Lanka	VU	two localities: Ritigala and Mundel
Oziotelphusa stricta	Ng & Tay	2001	Sri Lanka	VU	
Oziotelphusa wagrakarowensis	(Rathbun)	1904	India (Karnataka)	VU	
