= Sahyadriana =

Scientific classification
- Kingdom: Animalia
- Phylum: Arthropoda
- Clade: Pancrustacea
- Class: Malacostraca
- Order: Decapoda
- Suborder: Pleocyemata
- Infraorder: Brachyura
- Family: Gecarcinucidae
- Genus: Sahyadriana; Pati & Thackeray, 2018

Type species
- Sahyadriana sahyadriensis Pati & Thackeray, 2018

Genus of true crabs

Sahyadriana is a genus of true crabs in the family Gecarcinucidae. It contains 13 species, with Sahyadriana sahyadriensis as the type species. All known species of this genus are endemic to the Western Ghats, specifically in Maharashtra, India.

== Species ==
Sahyadriana contains the following species:

- Sahyadriana alcocki (Pati in Pati, Thackeray & Khaire, 2016)
- Sahyadriana billyarjani Pati & Thackeray, 2018
- Sahyadriana inopinata Pati & Thackeray, 2021
- Sahyadriana keshari Pati & Thackeray, 2021
- Sahyadriana pachyphallus Pati & Thackeray, 2018
- Sahyadriana pilosipes (Alcock, 1909)
- Sahyadriana sahyadriensis Pati & Thackeray, 2018
- Sahyadriana tamhini Pati & Thackeray, 2021
- Sahyadriana tenuiphallus Pati & Thackeray, 2018
- Sahyadriana thackerayi (Pati in Pati, Thackeray & Khaire, 2016)
- Sahyadriana triangulus (Pati & RM Sharma, 2014)
- Sahyadriana waghi (Pati in Pati, Thackeray & Khaire, 2016)
- Sahyadriana woodmasoni Pati & Thackeray, 2018
