= Sarasin's goby =

Conservation status
- Endangered (IUCN 3.1)

Scientific classification
- Kingdom: Animalia
- Phylum: Chordata
- Class: Actinopterygii
- Division: Teleostei
- Order: Gobiiformes
- Family: Oxudercidae
- Genus: Mugilogobius
- Species: M. sarasinorum

Binomial name
- Mugilogobius sarasinorum (Boulenger, 1897)

Synonyms
- Gobius sarasinorum Boulenger, 1897; Tamanka sarasinorum (Boulenger, 1897)

Species of fish

Mugilogobius sarasinorum, Sarasin's goby, is a species of goby that is endemic to Lake Poso in Sulawesi, Indonesia. This species can reach a length of 8 centimetres (3.1 in) in total length. Sarasin's goby is important to local commercial fisheries for the aquarium trade.

== Etymology ==
The fish is named in honor of Swiss naturalist-ethnologist Paul Sarasin (1856–1929) and his cousin, naturalist Fritz Sarasin (1859–1942), who collected the type specimens.

== Taxonomy ==
The Sarasin's goby was first described by George Albert Boulenger in 1897. It is classified in the family Oxudercidae, order Gobiiformes, class Actinopterygii. The species has been referred to by the synonyms Gobius sarasinorum and Tamanka sarasinorum.

== Description ==
This species grows to a maximum of 8 centimetres (3.1 in) in total length. Males are dark brown or gray-brown; females are lighter, with bars and mottling over the body. The dorsal fin has seven spines and eight to nine soft rays. The anal fin has one spine and eight to nine soft rays.

== Distribution ==
The Sarasin's goby is endemic to Lake Poso on the island of Sulawesi in Indonesia.

== Ecology ==
The fish prefers shallow waters with silt, sand, mud, or gravel substrates, or gravelly or rocky banks, where it is active during the day. It feeds on small fishes and insect larvae.

It is assessed as an endangered species on the IUCN Red List. Though it is abundant in its range, it is only found in Lake Poso and has a limited extent of occurrence of 500 km^{2} and area of occupancy of 323 km^{2}. Its population is believed to be declining due to a variety of threats in its narrow range. Its habitat is threatened by pollution and eutrophication as a result of agricultural runoff and waste from adjacent human communities; awareness programs have been implemented in the area to discourage herbicide and pesticide use to protect natural habitats. Local hydropower development has altered water levels and turbidity. Invasive species such as the Nile tilapia are vectors of disease and parasites, and are predation threats as well. The Sarasin's goby has been taken from the wild to be sold in the aquarium fish trade and has been seen in aquarium shops in India. Its native range is also vulnerable to natural disasters; the area is volcanically and seismically active, and in 1983, a gas release from the lake caused a fish kill.
