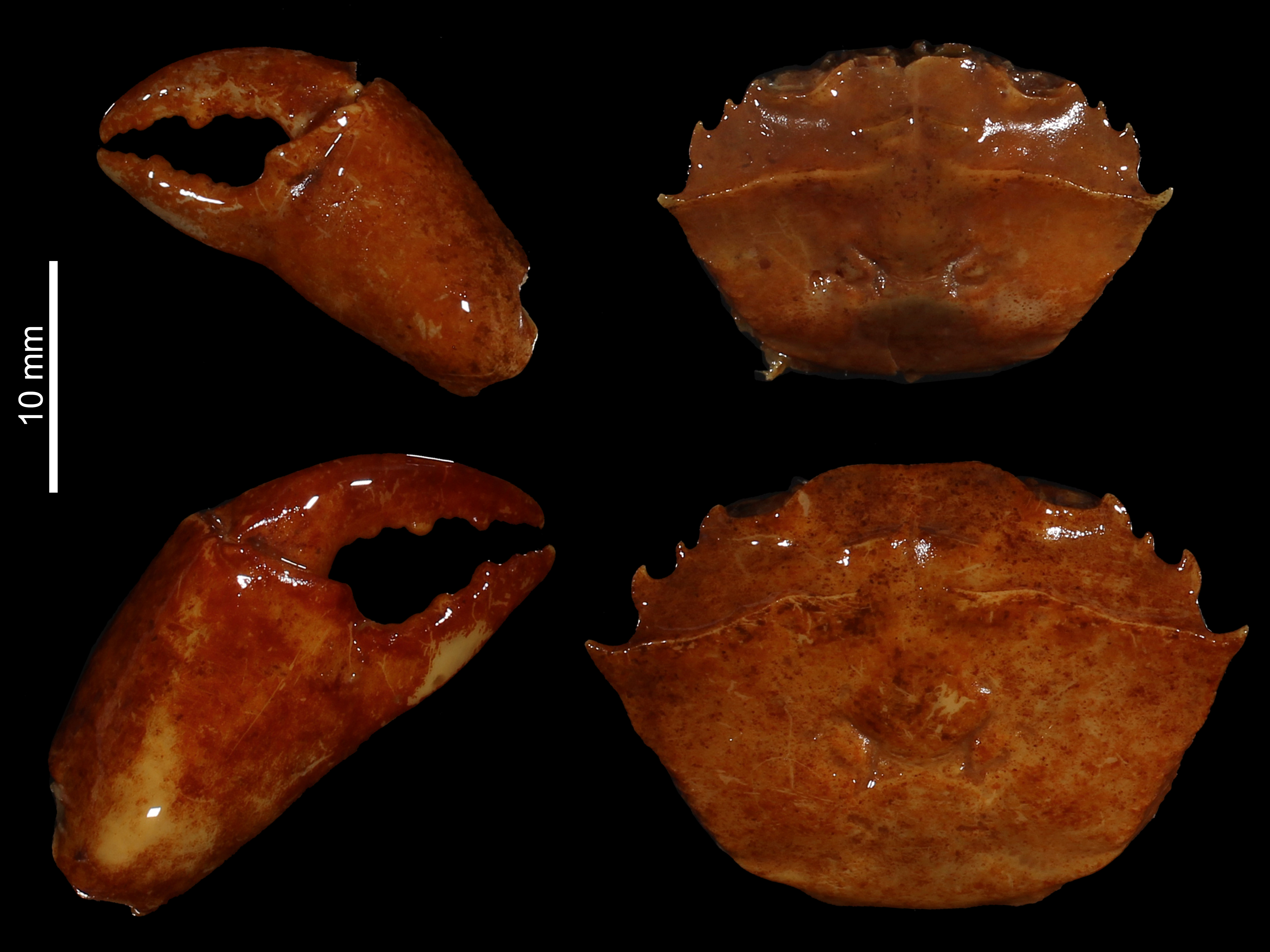
- Guinothusa beauvoisi

Scientific classification
- Domain: Eukaryota
- Kingdom: Animalia
- Phylum: Arthropoda
- Class: Malacostraca
- Order: Decapoda
- Suborder: Pleocyemata
- Infraorder: Brachyura
- Family: Gecarcinucidae
- Genus: Guinothusa; Yeo & Ng (2010)

= Guinothusa =

Genus of crabs

Guinothusa is a genus of freshwater crabs, found in South-East Asia.

== Species ==
- Guinothusa beauvoisi (Rathbun, 1902): Vietnam
- Guinothusa harmandi (Rathbun, 1902): Vietnam
- Guinothusa phimaiensis Yeo & Ng, 2010: Thailand
