= Gubernatoriana =

Scientific classification
- Domain: Eukaryota
- Kingdom: Animalia
- Phylum: Arthropoda
- Class: Malacostraca
- Order: Decapoda
- Suborder: Pleocyemata
- Infraorder: Brachyura
- Family: Gecarcinucidae
- Genus: Gubernatoriana; Bott, 1970

Type species
- Gubernatoriana gubernatoris Alcock, 1909

Genus of crabs

Gubernatoriana is a genus of freshwater crabs, found among the Western Ghats in India.

== Species ==
- Gubernatoriana basalticola (Klaus, Fernandez & Yeo, 2014)
- Gubernatoriana gubernatoris (Alcock, 1909)
- Gubernatoriana longipes (Pati & Thackeray, 2018)
- Gubernatoriana marleshwarensis (Pati & Thackeray, 2018)
- Gubernatoriana pilosipes (Alcock, 1909)
- Gubernatoriana triangulus (Pati & RM Sharma, 2014)
- Gubernatoriana wallacei (Pati & Thackeray, 2018)
