= Pilarta =

Scientific classification
- Kingdom: Animalia
- Phylum: Arthropoda
- Class: Malacostraca
- Order: Decapoda
- Suborder: Pleocyemata
- Infraorder: Brachyura
- Family: Gecarcinucidae
- Genus: Pilarta; Bahir & Yeo, 2007

Type species
- Pilarta anuka Bahir & Yeo, 2007

Genus of crabs

Pilarta is a genus of freshwater crabs that are endemic to the southern Western Ghats in India.

== Species ==
There are four species recognised in the genus Pilarta:

- Pilarta anuka Bahir & Yeo, 2007
- Pilarta aroma Pati, Rajesh, Raj, Sheeja, Kumar & Sureshan, 2017
- Pilarta punctatissima Pati, Rajesh, Raj, Sheeja, Kumar & Sureshan, 2017
- Pilarta vaman Raj, Kumar & Ng, 2025
