= Pendolo =

- Town
- Location within Sulawesi
- Coordinates: 2°4′S 120°41′E
- Country: Indonesia
- Regency: Poso Regency
- Subdistrict: South Pamona

Area
  - Total: 3,650 km^{2} (1,410 sq mi)
- Elevation: 525 m (1,722 ft)

Population (2015)
  - Total: 1,915
- Time zone: UTC+8 (+8)

Pendolo is a town and the administrative capital of South Pamona subdistrict in Poso Regency, Central Sulawesi, Indonesia.

Pendolo lies on the southern shore of Lake Poso, and crossed by the Trans-Sulawesi National Highway. Pendolo is regarded by tourists as one of the main stops before heading to the city of Poso, the provincial capital Palu, or Togean Islands National Park in Tojo Una-Una Regency, due to its location in the middle of the island of Sulawesi.
