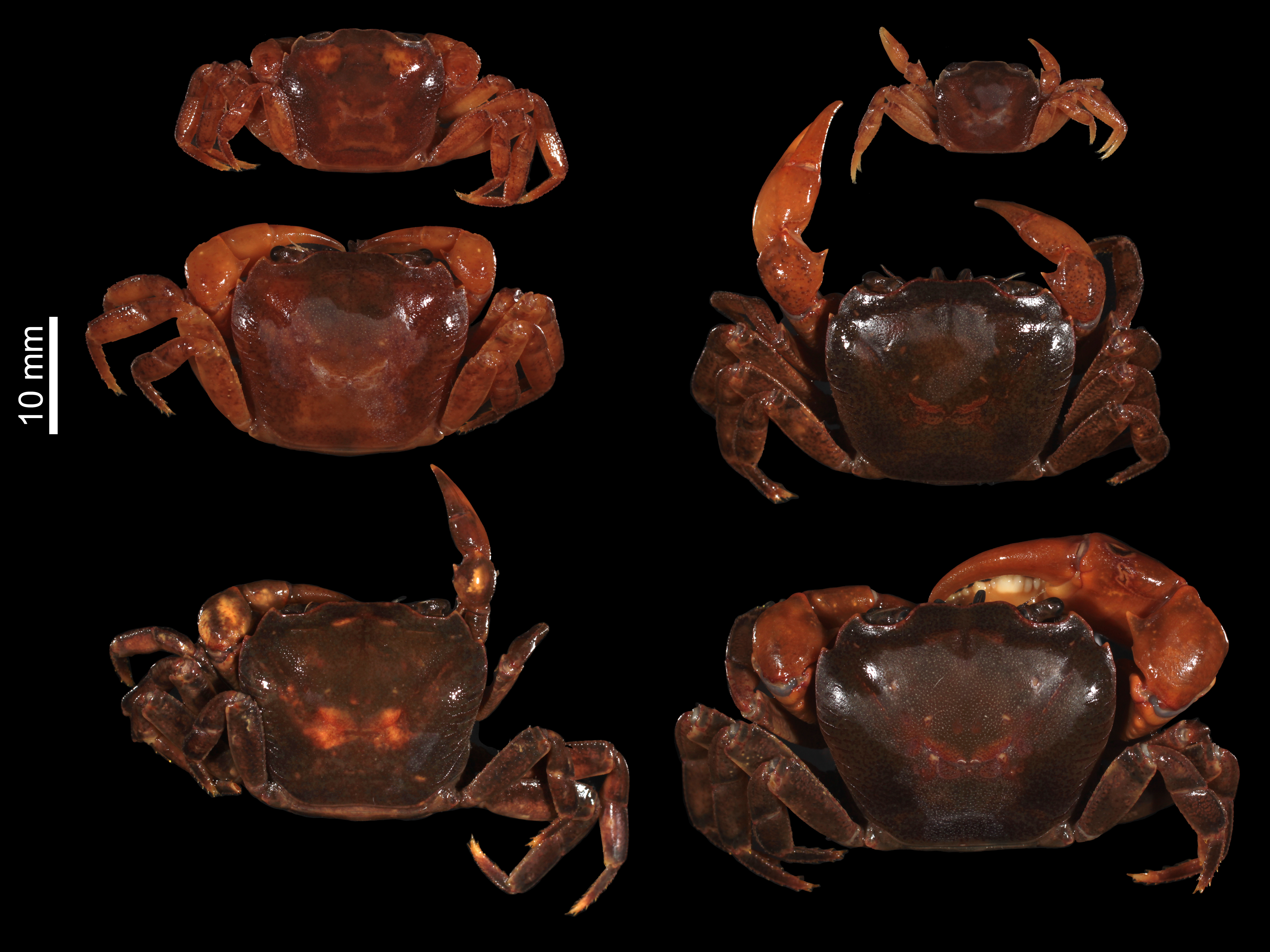
- Sundathelphusa cagayana specimen Photo: MNHN; Photographer:Noémy MOLLARET; Licensed under CC BY 4.0

Scientific classification
- Kingdom: Animalia
- Phylum: Arthropoda
- Class: Malacostraca
- Order: Decapoda
- Suborder: Pleocyemata
- Infraorder: Brachyura
- Family: Gecarcinucidae
- Genus: Sundathelphusa; Bott, 1969

Type species
- Parathelphusa grapsoides H. Milne-Edwards, 1853

= Sundathelphusa =

Genus of crabs

Sundathelphusa is a genus of freshwater crabs in the family Gecarcinucidae, endemic to the Philippines and parts of Indonesia, including Sulawesi. These crabs exhibit remarkable adaptations to diverse freshwater habitats, including caves and montane streams.

== Ecology and habitat ==
=== Habitat preferences ===
- Surface-dwelling species: Found in rivers, streams, and swamps (e.g., S. Cagayana in Luzon island).
- Despite being a cave-adapted species: Troglobitic forms like S. spelaeophila do not exhibit reduced eyes and pigmentation.
- Montane species: S. cagayana inhabits high-elevation streams in northeastern Luzon.

=== Ecological roles ===
- Nutrient cycling: Omnivorous, feeding on detritus, algae, and amorphous.
- Bioindicators: Sensitive to water pollution and habitat degradation.

=== Behavior ===
- Nocturnal activity: Most species forage at night to avoid predators.
- Burrowing: Construct burrows in muddy banks for shelter and reproduction.
- Reproduction: Direct development (no larval stage); females carry eggs under the abdomen.
- Cave adaptations: Troglobitic species rely on special adaptations due to reduced vision.

== Taxonomy and species ==
=== Distinction from Parathelphusa ===
- Morphology: Sundathelphusa has elongate ambulatory legs compared to Parathelphusa.
- Distribution: Sundathelphusa is restricted to the Philippines and Sulawesi, while Parathelphusa occurs in mainland Southeast Asia.

=== Species ===
- Sundathelphusa currently has the following species:
- Sundathelphusa angelito Ng & Mendoza, 2020
- Sundathelphusa antipoloensis (Rathbun, 1904)
- Sundathelphusa aruana (Roux, 1911)
- Sundathelphusa boex Ng & Sket, 1996
- Sundathelphusa cagayana Mendoza & Naruse, 2010
- Sundathelphusa cassiope (De Man, 1902)
- Sundathelphusa cavernicola (Takeda, 1983)
- Sundathelphusa cebu Husana & Ng, 2019
- Sundathelphusa celer (Ng, 1991)
- Sundathelphusa danae Husana, Yamamuro & Ng, 2014
- Sundathelphusa grapsoides (H. Milne Edwards, 1853)
- Sundathelphusa hades Takeda & Ng, 2001
- Sundathelphusa halmaherensis (De Man, 1902)
- Sundathelphusa holthuisi Ng, 2010
- Sundathelphusa jagori (von Martens, 1868)
- Sundathelphusa lobo Husana, Naruse & Kase, 2009
- Sundathelphusa longipes (Balss, 1937)
- Sundathelphusa miguelito Mendoza & Sy, 2017
- Sundathelphusa minahassae (Schenkel, 1902)
- Sundathelphusa mistio (Rathbun, 1904)
- Sundathelphusa molluscivora Schubart & Ng, 2008
- Sundathelphusa montana (Bürger, 1894)
- Sundathelphusa montanoanus (Rathbun, 1904)
- Sundathelphusa niwangtiil Husana, Kase & Mendoza, 2015
- Sundathelphusa orsoni Husana, Kase & Mendoza, 2015
- Sundathelphusa philippina (von Martens, 1868)
- Sundathelphusa picta (von Martens, 1868)
- Sundathelphusa prosperidad Husana, 2020
- Sundathelphusa quirino Husana & Ng, 2019
- Sundathelphusa roberti Ng & Mendoza, 2024
- Sundathelphusa rubra (Schenkel, 1902)
- Sundathelphusa sottoae Ng & Sket, 1996
- Sundathelphusa subquadratus (Gerstaecker, 1856)
- Sundathelphusa sutteri (Bott, 1970)
- Sundathelphusa tuerkayi Ng & Anker, 2016
- Sundathelphusa urichi Ng & Sket, 1996
- Sundathelphusa uva Ng & Mendoza, 2020
- Sundathelphusa vedeniki Ng & Sket, 1996
- Sundathelphusa vienae Husana, Yamamuro & Ng, 2014
- Sundathelphusa waray Husana, Naruse & Kase, 2009
- Sundathelphusa wolterecki (Balss, 1937)
- Sundathelphusa aspera Ng & Stuebing, 1989 synonymous to Borneosa aspera (Ng & Stuebing, 1989)
- Sundathelphusa brachyphallus Ng, 2015 synonymous to Borneosa brachyphallus (Ng, 2015)
- Sundathelphusa spelaeophila Stasolla, Abbarchi & Innocenti, 2015 synonymous to Sundathelphusa philippina (von Martens, 1868)
- Sundathelphusa tenebrosa Holthuis, 1979 synonymous to Borneosa tenebrosa Holthuis, 1979

== Conservation ==
=== Threats ===
- Habitat loss due to deforestation, mining, and urban development.
- Pollution of freshwater ecosystems.
- Introduction of invasive species.
