= Holthuisana =

Scientific classification
- Domain: Eukaryota
- Kingdom: Animalia
- Phylum: Arthropoda
- Class: Malacostraca
- Order: Decapoda
- Suborder: Pleocyemata
- Infraorder: Brachyura
- Family: Gecarcinucidae
- Genus: Holthuisana; Bott, 1969

Genus of crabs

Holthuisana is a genus of crabs belonging to the family Gecarcinucidae.

The species of this genus are found in Australia.

Species:

- Holthuisana alba Holthuis, 1980
- Holthuisana beauforti (Roux, 1911)
- Holthuisana biroi (Nobili, 1905)
- Holthuisana boesemani Bott, 1974
- Holthuisana briggsi (Rathbun, 1926)
- Holthuisana festiva (Roux, 1911)
- Holthuisana lipkei N.g.Wowor, 2009
- Holthuisana loriae (Nobili, 1899)
- Holthuisana subconvexa (Roux, 1927)
- Holthuisana tikus N.g.Wowor, 2009
- Holthuisana vanheurni (Roux, 1927)
- Holthuisana wollastoni (Calman, 1914)
