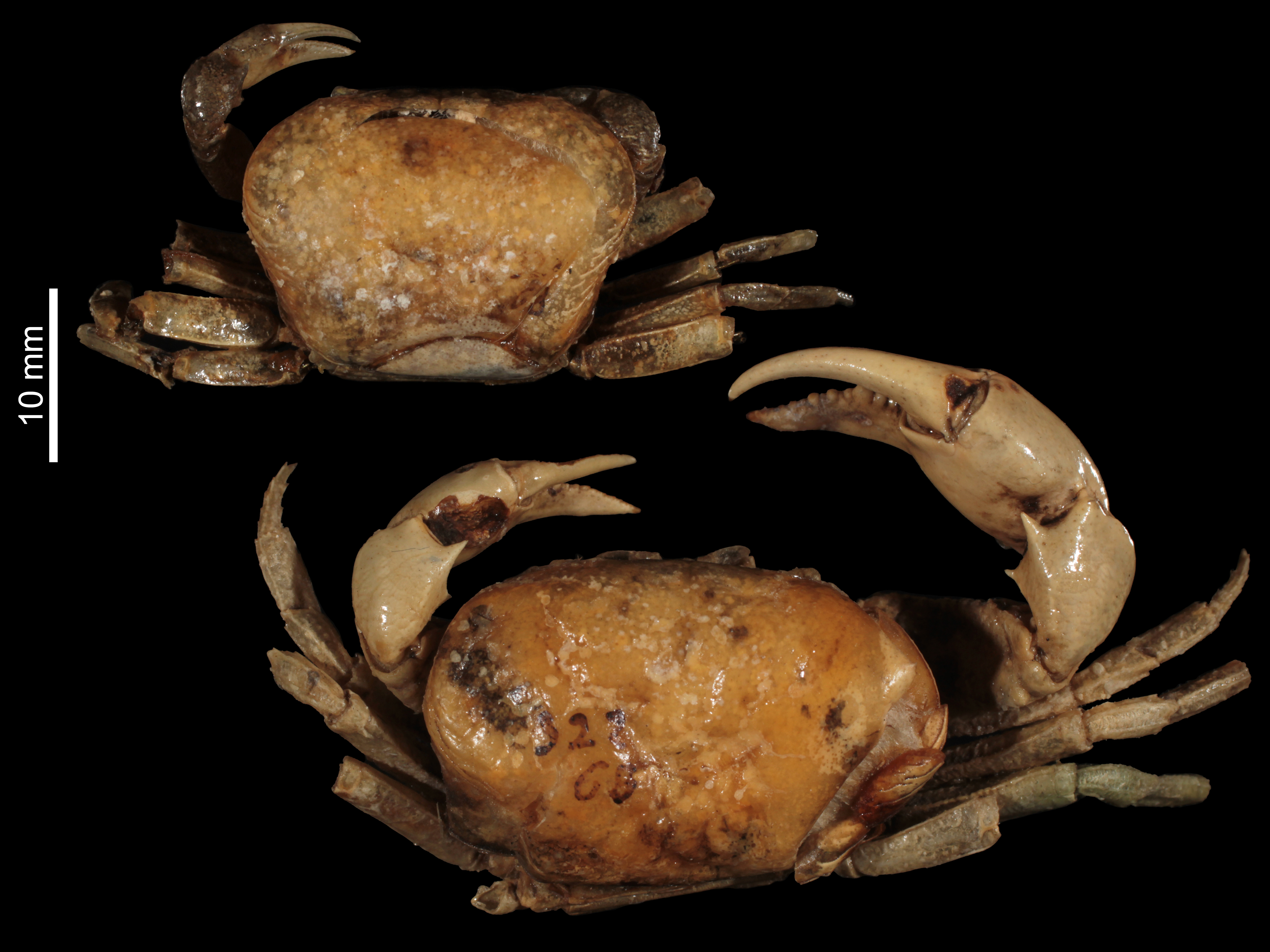
- Austrothelphusa transversa

Scientific classification
- Kingdom: Animalia
- Phylum: Arthropoda
- Class: Malacostraca
- Order: Decapoda
- Suborder: Pleocyemata
- Infraorder: Brachyura
- Family: Gecarcinucidae
- Genus: Austrothelphusa; Bott, 1969

Type species
- Thelphusa transversa Von Martens, 1868

= Austrothelphusa =

Genus of crabs

Austrothelphusa is a genus of freshwater crab endemic to Australia, comprising the following species:

- Austrothelphusa agassizi (Rathbun, 1905)
- Austrothelphusa angustifrons (A. Milne-Edwards, 1869)
- Austrothelphusa insularis (Colosi, 1919)
- Austrothelphusa raceki (Bishop, 1963)
- Austrothelphusa tigrina (Short, 1994)
- Austrothelphusa transversa (von Martens, 1868)
- Austrothelphusa valentula (Riek, 1951)
- Austrothelphusa wasselli (Bishop, 1963)

Most of these species are restricted to Queensland, but Austrothelphusa transversa is also found in New South Wales, South Australia, Northern Territory and Western Australia.

These crabs grow to a carapace width of 50 millimetres (2.0 in) and are omnivores.
