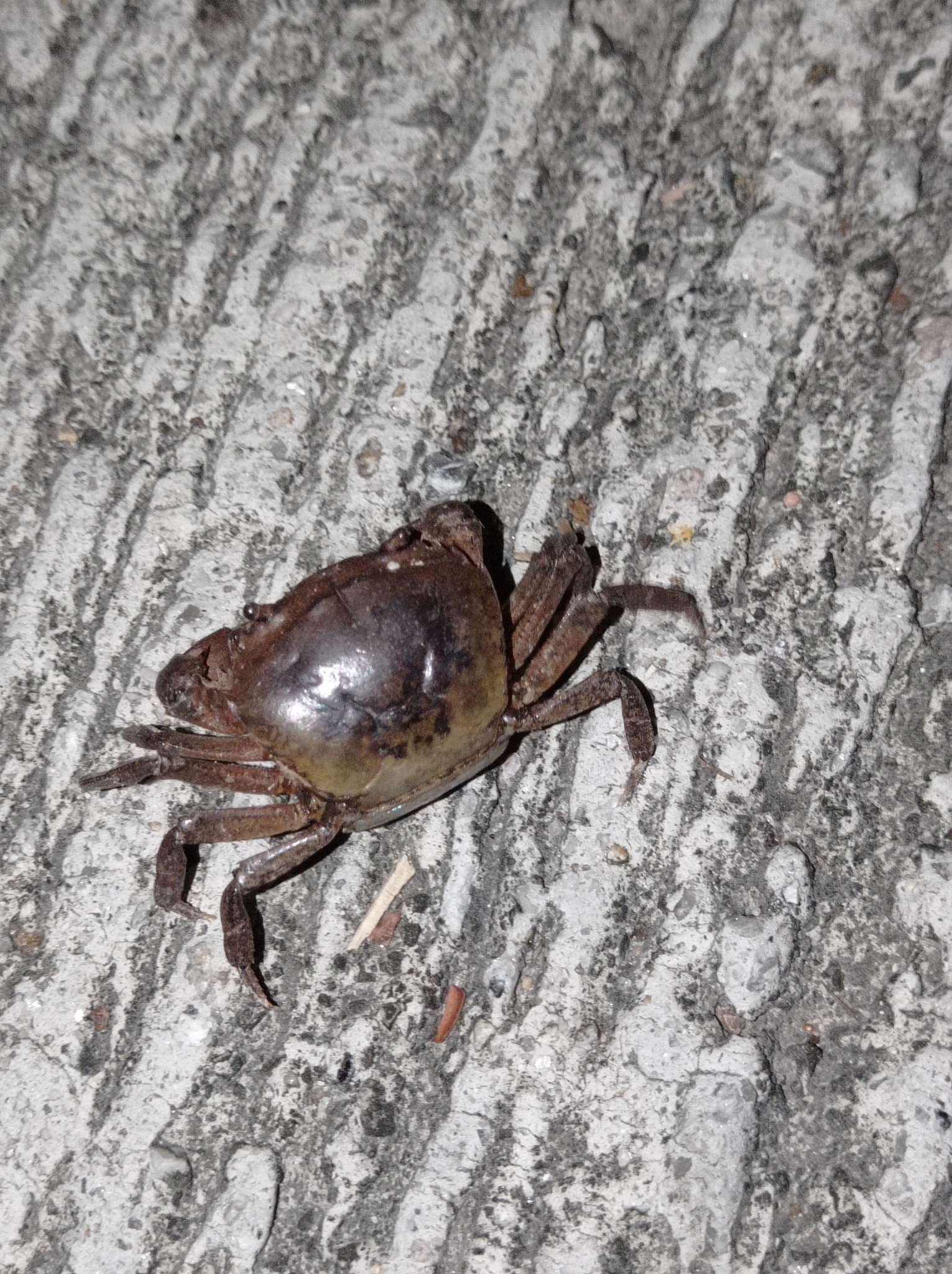
- Somanniathelphusa zanklon, China

Scientific classification
- Kingdom: Animalia
- Phylum: Arthropoda
- Class: Malacostraca
- Order: Decapoda
- Suborder: Pleocyemata
- Infraorder: Brachyura
- Superfamily: Gecarcinucoidea
- Family: Gecarcinucidae
- Genus: Somanniathelphusa; Bott, 1968

= Somanniathelphusa =

Genus of crabs

Somanniathelphusa is a genus of freshwater crabs found in southeast China, Taiwan, and southeast Asia. It includes the following species:

- Somanniathelphusa amoyensis Naiyanetr & Dai, 1997
- Somanniathelphusa araeochela Naiyanetr & Dai, 1997
- Somanniathelphusa bawangensis Dai & Xing, 1994
- Somanniathelphusa boyangensis Dai, Peng & Zhou, 1994
- Somanniathelphusa brevipodum Tai, Song, He, Cao, Xu & Zhong, 1975
- Somanniathelphusa dangi Yeo & Nguyen, 1999: Vietnam
- Somanniathelphusa falx Ng & Dudgeon, 1992
- Somanniathelphusa gaoyunensis Dai, Peng & Zhou, 1994
- Somanniathelphusa grayi (Alcock, 1909)
- Somanniathelphusa guillinensis Naiyanetr & Dai, 1997
- Somanniathelphusa hainanensis Dai & Xing, 1994
- Somanniathelphusa huaanensis Naiyanetr & Dai, 1997
- Somanniathelphusa huanglungensis Dai, Peng & Zhou, 1994
- Somanniathelphusa kyphuensis Dang, 1975: Vietnam
- Somanniathelphusa lacuvita Ng, 1995
- Somanniathelphusa linchuanensis Dai, Peng & Zhou, 1994
- Somanniathelphusa longicaudus Naiyanetr & Dai, 1997
- Somanniathelphusa megachela Naiyanetr & Dai, 1997
- Somanniathelphusa nanningensis Naiyanetr & Dai, 1997
- Somanniathelphusa pax Ng & Kosuge, 1995: Vietnam
- Somanniathelphusa plicatus (Fabricius, 1798): Vietnam
- Somanniathelphusa qiongshanensis Dai & Xing, 1994
- Somanniathelphusa ruijiensis Dai, Peng & Zhou, 1994
- Somanniathelphusa sinensis (H. Milne-Edwards, 1853): China, Vietnam
- Somanniathelphusa taiwanensis Bott, 1968
- Somanniathelphusa tongzhaensis Naiyanetr & Dai, 1997
- Somanniathelphusa triangularis Dang & Hai, 2005: Vietnam
- Somanniathelphusa yangshanensis Naiyanetr & Dai, 1997
- Somanniathelphusa yuilinensis Naiyanetr & Dai, 1997
- Somanniathelphusa zanklon Ng & Dudgeon, 1992
- Somanniathelphusa zhangpuensis Naiyanetr & Dai, 1997
- Somanniathelphusa zhapoensis Naiyanetr & Dai, 1997
- Somanniathelphusa zhongshiensis Dai, Peng & Zhou, 1994
