= Spiralothelphusa =

Scientific classification
- Kingdom: Animalia
- Phylum: Arthropoda
- Class: Malacostraca
- Order: Decapoda
- Suborder: Pleocyemata
- Infraorder: Brachyura
- Family: Gecarcinucidae
- Genus: Spiralothelphusa; Bott, 1968

Type species
- Cancer hydrodromus Herbst, 1794

Genus of crabs

Spiralothelphusa is a genus of freshwater crabs in the family Gecarcinucidae. It contains these species, all of which are included on the IUCN Red List:

== Species ==
Species	Authority	Year	Distribution	IUCN status
Spiralothelphusa fernandoi	Ng	1994	Sri Lanka	EN
Spiralothelphusa hydrodroma	(Herbst)	1794	India	LC
Spiralothelphusa parvula	(Fernando)	1961	Sri Lanka	EN
Spiralothelphusa wuellerstorfi	(Heller)	1862	India	DD

(LC: least concern; EN: endangered; DD: data deficient)
