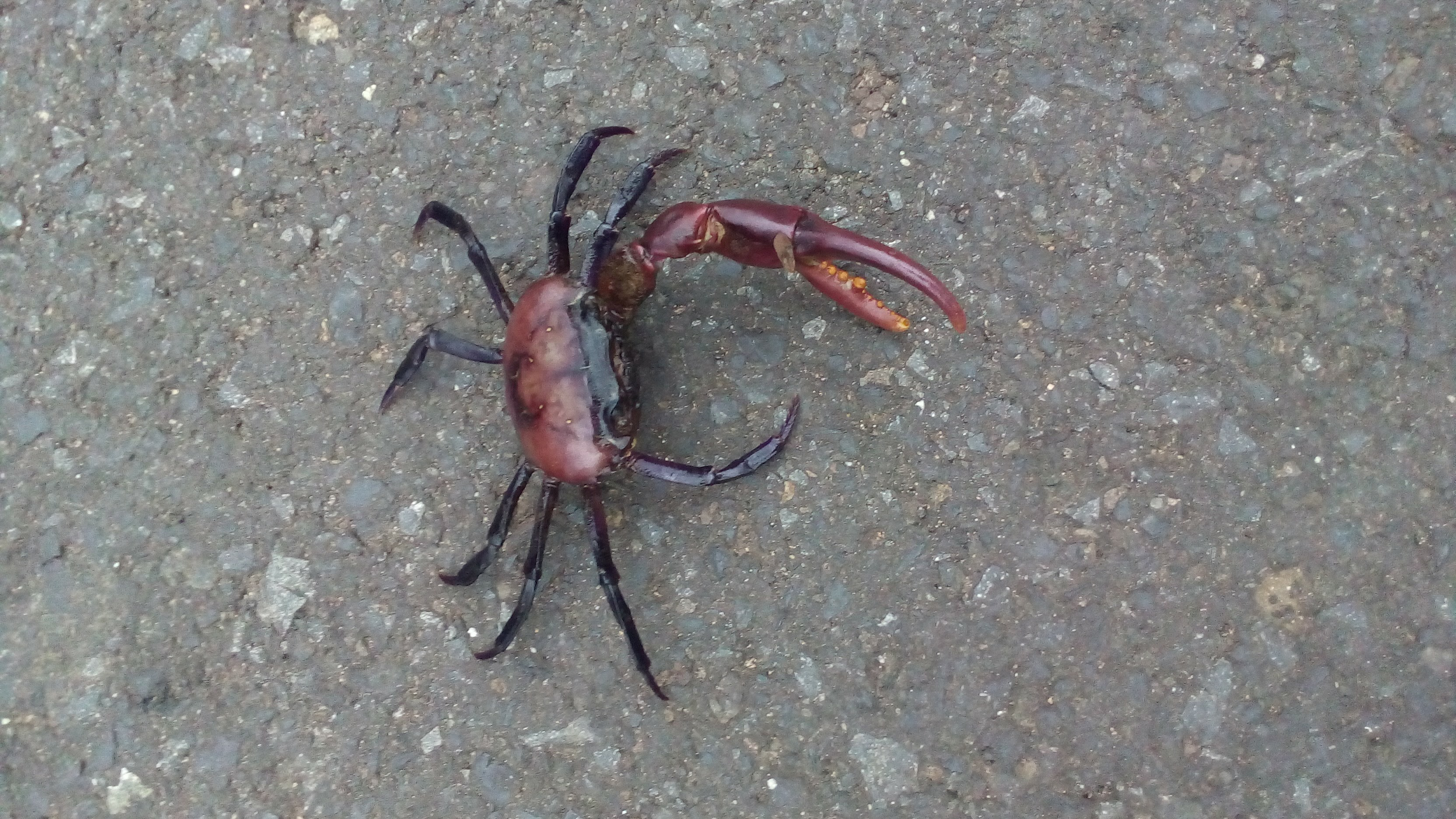
- Esanthelphusa

Scientific classification
- Domain: Eukaryota
- Kingdom: Animalia
- Phylum: Arthropoda
- Class: Malacostraca
- Order: Decapoda
- Suborder: Pleocyemata
- Infraorder: Brachyura
- Family: Gecarcinucidae
- Genus: Esanthelphusa; Naiyanetr (1994)

= Esanthelphusa =

Genus of crabs

Esanthelphusa is a genus of freshwater crabs, found in South-East Asia.

== Species ==
- Esanthelphusa chiangmai (Ng & Naiyanetr, 1993)
- Esanthelphusa denchaii (Naiyanetr, 1984)
- Esanthelphusa dugasti (Rathbun, 1902): Laos, Thailand, Vietnam
- Esanthelphusa fangensis (Naiyanetr, 1987)
- Esanthelphusa nani (Naiyanetr, 1984)
- Esanthelphusa nimoafi Yeo, 2004: Laos
- Esanthelphusa phetchaburi (Ng & Naiyanetr, 1993)
- Esanthelphusa prolatus (Rathbun, 1902): Vietnam
