= Syntripsa =

Scientific classification
- Kingdom: Animalia
- Phylum: Arthropoda
- Class: Malacostraca
- Order: Decapoda
- Suborder: Pleocyemata
- Infraorder: Brachyura
- Family: Gecarcinucidae
- Subfamily: Parathelphusinae
- Genus: Syntripsa; Chia & Ng, 2006

Type species
- Syntripsa matannensis

Genus of crabs

Syntripsa is a genus of freshwater crabs found in lakes on the Indonesian island of Sulawesi.

== Species ==
There are two species in this genus:

- Syntripsa flavichela Chia & Ng, 2006
- Syntripsa matannensis (Schenkel, 1902)
