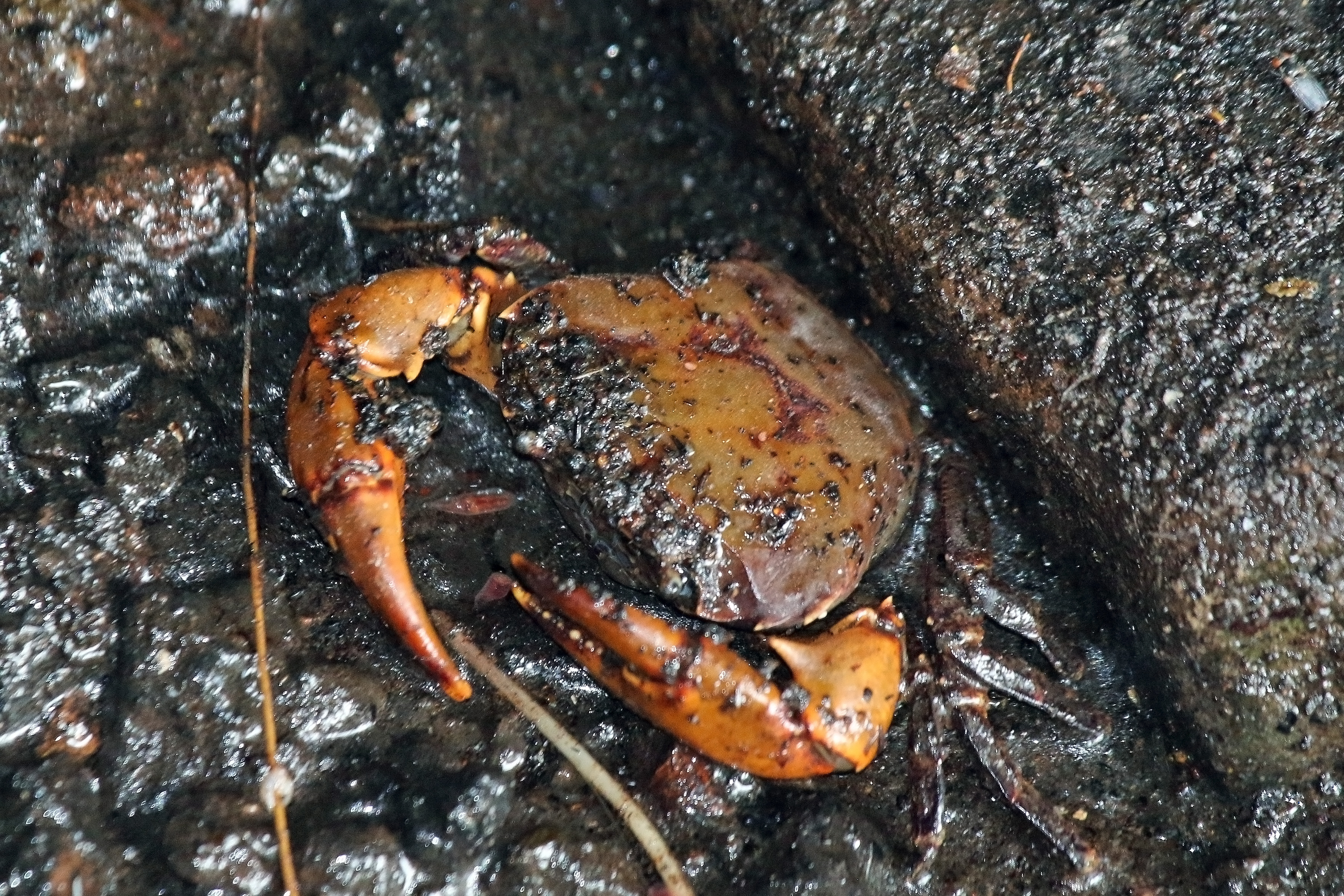
- Arachnothelphusa rhadamanthysi, Gomantong Caves, Borneo.

Scientific classification
- Kingdom: Animalia
- Phylum: Arthropoda
- Class: Malacostraca
- Order: Decapoda
- Suborder: Pleocyemata
- Infraorder: Brachyura
- Family: Gecarcinucidae
- Genus: Arachnothelphusa; Ng, 1991

= Arachnothelphusa =

Genus of crabs

Arachnothelphusa is a genus of highly specialised, semi-terrestrial freshwater crabs in the family Gecarcinucidae. Established by Peter K. L. Ng in 1991, their name translates roughly to "spider-crab," referring to their unusually long, slender ambulatory legs. Strictly endemic to the island of Borneo, their distribution spans across the Malaysian states of Sabah and Sarawak, as well as the Indonesian province of Kalimantan. They have largely abandoned rivers for extreme micro-habitats; several species are exclusively arboreal and live in phytotelms (water-filled tree holes) high in the rainforest canopy, while others are cavernicolous (cave-dwelling), living deep within pitch-black limestone karst caves.

== Taxonomy ==
=== Taxonomic history ===
Prior to 1991, species currently assigned to Arachnothelphusa were classified under the broader genus Thelphusa. However, researchers had previously noted that Thelphusa contained distinctly different morphological groupings, suggesting the genus was heterogeneous. One specific group of these Bornean crabs stood out due to their exceptionally long walking legs, convex carapace edges and the distinct structure of their gonopods (male reproductive appendages). To address this taxonomic inconsistency, Peter K. L. Ng formally erected the new genus Arachnothelphusa in 1991 to accommodate these cursorial species, designating Potamon melanippe as the type species.

=== Etymology ===
The generic name is a combination of the Greek word Arachne (meaning "spider") and thelphusa. This name refers to the unusually long, spider-like ambulatory legs characteristic of the genus.

=== Species ===
The genus Arachnothelphusa currently contains eight recognized species:

- Arachnothelphusa bako Ng, 2021
- Arachnothelphusa kadamaiana (Borradaile, 1900)
- Arachnothelphusa melanippe (De Man, 1899)
- Arachnothelphusa merarapensis Grinang, Pui & Ng, 2015
- Arachnothelphusa rhadamanthysi Ng & Goh, 1987
- Arachnothelphusa rimba Ng, 2021
- Arachnothelphusa sarang Grinang & Ng, 2021
- Arachnothelphusa terrapes Ng, 1991

== Morphology ==
Species within Arachnothelphusa are relatively small crabs, with the largest recorded male (A. terrapes) measuring 25.7 by 18.6 mm. They possess several distinct morphological traits adapted for their semi-terrestrial, cursorial (running and climbing) lifestyle:

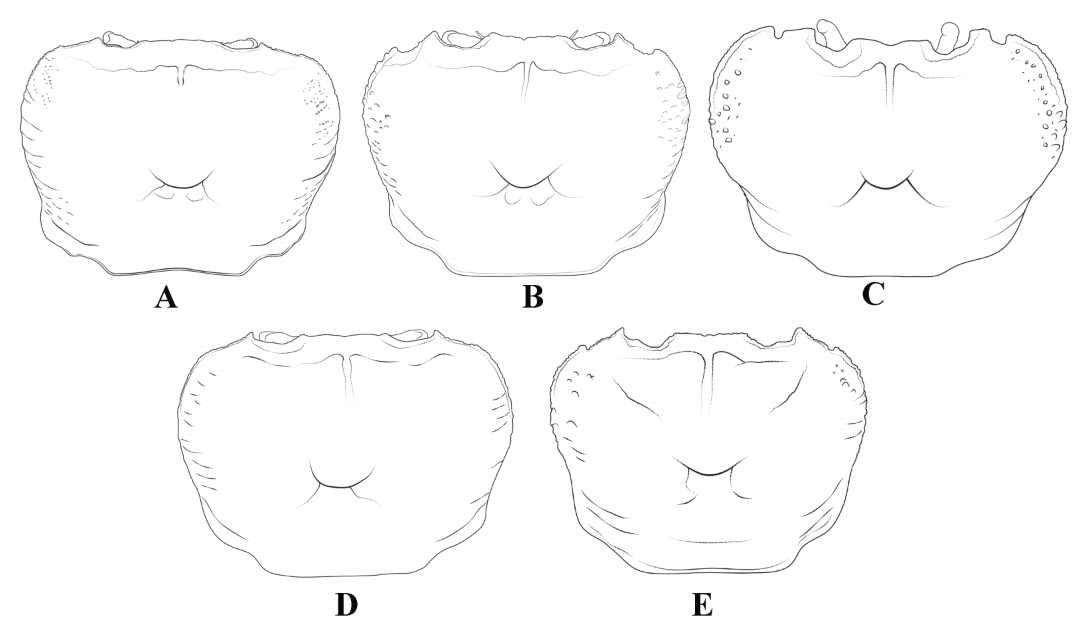
Carapace morphology of various Arachnothelphusa species, Jongkar Grinang & Peter K. L. Ng (2021)

=== Carapace ===
The carapace is transversely ovate, with a surface that is slightly to distinctly convex and often rugose (wrinkled or granular). The anterolateral margins are convex and depending on the species, the epibranchial tooth can range from acutely triangular to low and indistinct.

=== Legs ===
Their most defining feature is their exceptionally long, spider-like ambulatory legs. The merus (upper leg segment) is subequal to the length of the entire carapace. The meri of their chelipeds (claws), however, are not distinctly elongated.

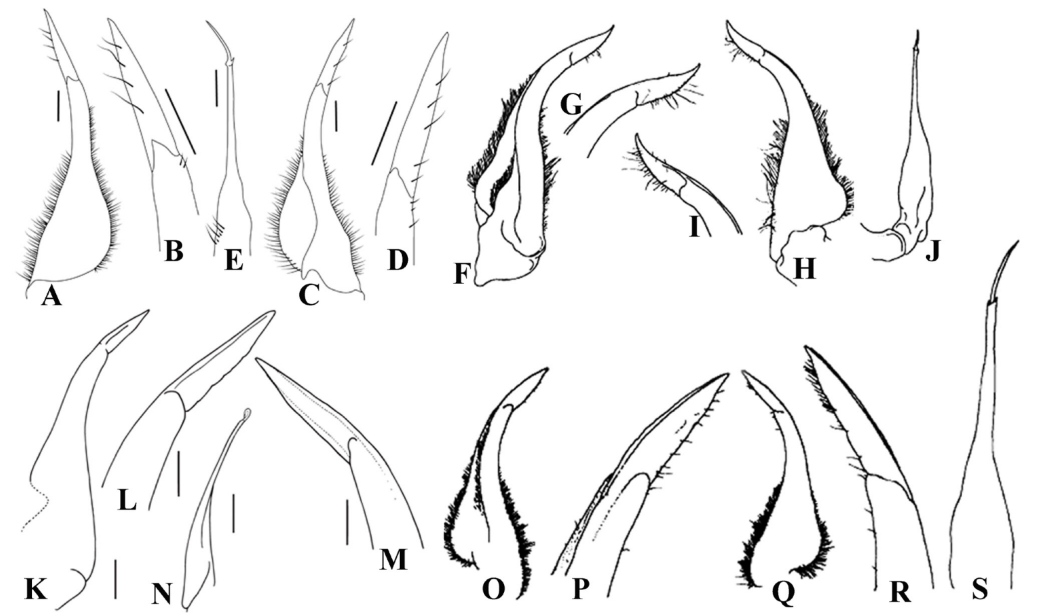
Gonopod morphology of various Arachnothelphusa species, Jongkar Grinang & Peter K. L. Ng (2021)

=== Gonopods ===
In males, the first gonopod (G1) is slender and sinuous, featuring a cylindrical, tapering terminal segment that is about one-third to one-quarter the length of the subterminal segment. The second gonopod (G2) has a short distal segment.

=== Coloration ===
Live coloration varies drastically depending on the species' habitat. Epigeal (surface-dwelling) and arboreal species are often vibrantly colored, such as the bright purple A. merarapensis or the dark reddish-brown to purple A. terrapes. Conversely, cavernicolous species like A. rhadamanthysi and A. sarang exhibit pale body colouration ranging from straw-yellow to light purplish-brown.

== Habitat and ecology ==
While some early specimens like A. melanippe were collected from small forest streams, the genus is best known for its members' adaptations to extreme, isolated micro-habitats.

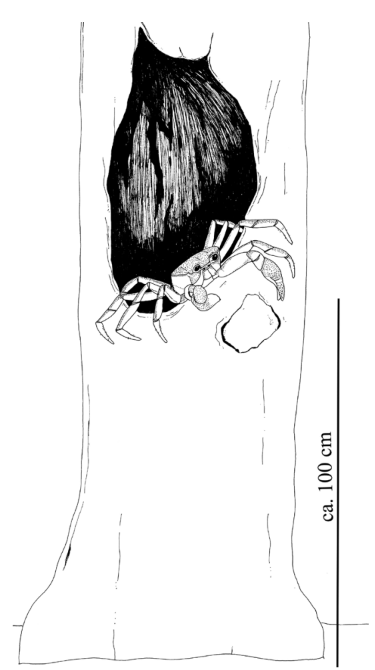
Illustration of Arachnothelphusa merarapensis, new species, holotype male (22.5 × 16.8 mm) (ZRC), emerging at night from its filled-water tree-hole in primary dipterocarp forest, Merarap Hot Spring, Lawas, Sarawak.

=== Arboreal and phytotelm behaviour ===
Several species, including A. terrapes, A. merarapensis and A. rimba, are true phytotelm crabs. They are predominantly arboreal, living exclusively inside water-filled tree holes or crevices within tree buttresses in primary dipterocarp forests. Their unusually long ambulatory legs allow them to easily scramble up tree trunks, branches and twigs to reach these arboreal pools. They are nocturnal and highly sensitive to light; when disturbed, they will swiftly retreat and submerge themselves into the murky water of their tree holes to avoid predation. These crabs are completely reliant on these micro-habitats for their life cycle, with females observed carrying newly hatched young directly inside the tree holes. Because they live high up in trees or on hill inclines away from typical water bodies, this adaptation may help them avoid competition with other river-dwelling freshwater crabs.

=== Cavernicolous behaviour ===
Other species in the genus, specifically A. rhadamanthysi and A. sarang, have evolved to live inside limestone karst cave systems. A. sarang inhabits water pools with fine substrates deep within the interior of cave systems, while A. rhadamanthysi has been found on stalagmite walls in more exposed areas near cave entrances. Despite their pale colouration and cave-dwelling nature, they are not considered true stygobitic or troglobitic species. They are classified as troglophilic, as their eyes are not reduced and their corneas remain fully pigmented and functional.

== Conservation status ==
Within the International Union for Conservation of Nature (IUCN) Red List of Threatened Species, the conservation statuses of assessed Arachnothelphusa species vary. A. kadamaiana, A. rhadamanthysi and A. terrapes are currently classified as Least Concern. Conversely, A. melanippe is classified as Vulnerable.

Many of the more recently discovered species currently lack official IUCN assessments (effectively unassessed or Data Deficient). However, researchers have strongly recommended that newer discoveries, such as the phytotelm-dwelling A. merarapensis, be officially classified as Vulnerable. This is due to their highly localized, micro-endemic distributions and the looming threat of habitat loss from local logging activities.
