= Pastilla dacuna =

Conservation status
- Endangered (IUCN 3.1)

Scientific classification
- Kingdom: Animalia
- Phylum: Arthropoda
- Class: Malacostraca
- Order: Decapoda
- Suborder: Pleocyemata
- Infraorder: Brachyura
- Family: Gecarcinucidae
- Genus: Pastilla; Ng & Tay, 2001
- Species: P. dacuna

Binomial name
- Pastilla dacuna Ng & Tay, 2001

Species of crab

Pastilla dacuna is a species of freshwater crab in the monotypic genus Pastilla in the family Gecarcinucidae. It is endemic to Sri Lanka. Its natural habitats are subtropical or tropical moist lowland forests, subtropical or tropical swamps, and rivers. It is threatened by habitat loss.
