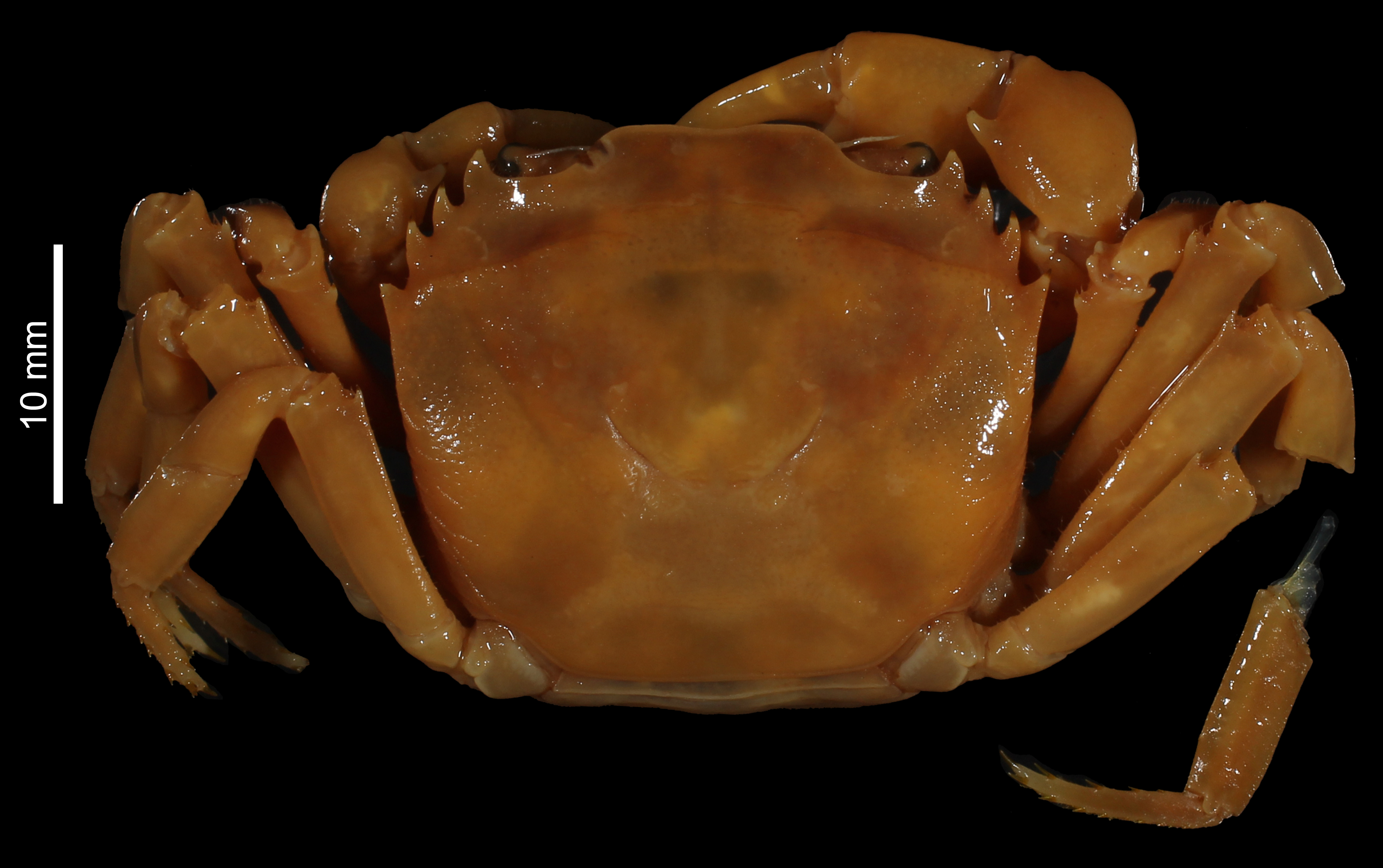
- Mekhongthelphusa tetragona

Scientific classification
- Kingdom: Animalia
- Phylum: Arthropoda
- Class: Malacostraca
- Order: Decapoda
- Suborder: Pleocyemata
- Infraorder: Brachyura
- Family: Gecarcinucidae
- Genus: Mekhongthelphusa; Naiyanetr (1985)

= Mekhongthelphusa =

Genus of crabs

Mekhongthelphusa is a genus of freshwater crabs in the family Gecarcinucidae, found in South-East Asia.

== Species ==
- Mekhongthelphusa brandti (Bott, 1968): Thailand, Vietnam
- Mekhongthelphusa kengsaphu Naiyanetr & Ng, 1995
- Mekhongthelphusa neisi (Rathbun, 1902): Vietnam
- Mekhongthelphusa tetragona (Rathbun, 1902)
