= Clinothelphusa =

Conservation status
- Critically Endangered (IUCN 3.1)

Scientific classification
- Kingdom: Animalia
- Phylum: Arthropoda
- Class: Malacostraca
- Order: Decapoda
- Suborder: Pleocyemata
- Infraorder: Brachyura
- Family: Gecarcinucidae
- Genus: Clinothelphusa; Tay & Ng, 2001
- Species: C. kakoota

Binomial name
- Clinothelphusa kakoota Tay & Ng, 2001

Genus of crabs

Clinothelphusa kakoota is a species of crab in the family Gecarcinucidae, which is endemic to Sri Lanka. Its natural habitats are subtropical or tropical moist lowland forests, subtropical or tropical swamps, and rivers. It is threatened by habitat loss, and is listed as a critically endangered species on the IUCN Red List. It is known from a single site with an area of less than 100 km^{2} (39 sq mi). Its nearest relatives are another Sri Lankan endemic genus of crabs, Ceylonthelphusa.
