= Migmathelphusa =

Conservation status
- Endangered (IUCN 3.1)

Scientific classification
- Kingdom: Animalia
- Phylum: Arthropoda
- Class: Malacostraca
- Order: Decapoda
- Suborder: Pleocyemata
- Infraorder: Brachyura
- Family: Gecarcinucidae
- Genus: Migmathelphusa; Chia & Ng, 2006
- Species: M. olivacea

Binomial name
- Migmathelphusa olivacea Chia & Ng, 2006

Monotypic genus of crab

Migmathelphusa olivacea is a species of freshwater crab found in Lake Poso on the Indonesian island of Sulawesi. It is the only species in its genus, Migmathelphusa. It is listed by the IUCN as Endangered, given "its extent of occurrence and area of occupancy is less than 500 square kilometres (190 sq mi)", and its individuals being found in less than five locations. There is also a "decline in the extent and quality of its habitat and it is not found in a protected area". Being found around a lake, "present and future threats to this species include human-induced habitat loss/degradation due to population increases and industrial and agrarian development".
