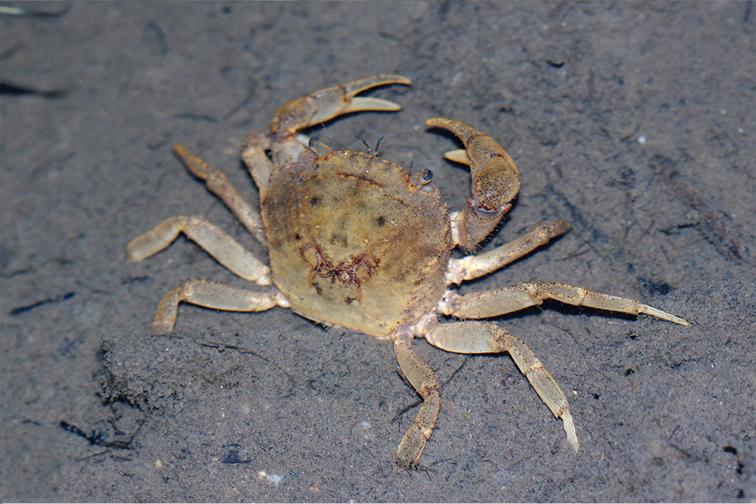

Scientific classification
- Kingdom: Animalia
- Phylum: Arthropoda
- Clade: Pancrustacea
- Class: Malacostraca
- Order: Decapoda
- Suborder: Pleocyemata
- Infraorder: Brachyura
- Section: Eubrachyura
- Subsection: Heterotremata
- Superfamily: Gecarcinucoidea
- Family: Gecarcinucidae; Rathbun, 1904

Genera
- See genera

= Gecarcinucidae =

Family of crabs

The Gecarcinucidae are a family of true freshwater crabs. They are found throughout South Asia, Southeast Asia and New Guinea, with a single genus found in Australia.

== Taxonomy ==
The family Parathelphusidae is now demoted to the rank of subfamily, as the Parathelphusinae, within the Gecarcinucidae. "Family" Parathelphusidae is now considered as a junior synonym.

The Gecarcinucidae are thought to have originated in the Indian subcontinent when it was an island continent in the Paleogene, despite not being of ancient Gondwanan origins themselves (unlike other lineages that are thought to have originated in Insular India). Divergence estimates indicate that the Gecarcinucidae originate from Southeast Asian ancestors that dispersed to India during the middle Eocene, before India collided with Asia. This is thought to have occurred due to India drifting close enough to Southeast Asia to allow for biotic exchange between both regions. As the Gecarcinucidae are a freshwater group that could not disperse via marine habitats, this indicates that temporary land bridges may have formed in the Eocene between India and Southeast Asia, allowing for the dispersal of freshwater organisms to India while it was still isolated. Following the India-Asia collision, the Gecarcinucidae dispersed back into mainland Asia, and from there to Australasia.

The Gecarcinucidae are thought to be the sister group to the Potamoidea (the superfamily comprising the Potamidae and Potamonautidae).

== Genera ==
Gecarcinucidae contains the following genera:

- Abortelphusa Mitra, 2020
- Adeleana Bott, 1969
- Anamudiana Pati, 2025
- Arachnothelphusa Ng, 1991
- Aradhya Pati, Bajantri & Hedge, 2023
- Arcithelphusa Pati & Suda Devi, 2015
- Austrothelphusa Bott, 1969
- Bakousa Ng, 1995
- Balssiathelphusa Bott, 1969
- Baratha Bahir & Yeo, 2007
- Barusa Pati & Yeo, 2022
- Barytelphusa Alcock, 1909
- Borneosa Ng & Grinang, 2022
- Ceylonthelphusa Bott, 1969
- Clinothelphusa Ng & Tay, 2001
- Coccusa Tan & Ng, 1998
- Currothelphusa Ng, 1990
- Cylindrotelphusa Alcock, 1909
- Esanthelphusa Naiyanetr, 1994
- Gecarcinucus H. Milne Edwards, 1844
- Geelvinkia Bott, 1974
- Geithusa Ng, 1989
- Ghatiana Pati & Sharma, 2014
- Globitelphusa Alcock, 1909
- Gubernatoriana Bott, 1970
- Guinothusa Yeo & Ng, 2010
- Heterothelphusa Ng & Lim, 1986
- Holthuisana Bott, 1969
- Idukkiana Pati, 2025
- Inglethelphusa Bott, 1970
- Irmengardia Bott, 1969
- Kani Kumar, Raj & Ng, 2017
- Karkata Pati, Rajesh, Raj, Sheeja, Kumar & Sureshan, 2017
- Kasargodia Raj, Kumar & Ng, 2025
- Lamella Bahir & Yeo, 2007
- Lemurophusa Ng & Guinot, 2026
- Lepidothelphusa Colosi, 1920
- Liotelphusa Alcock, 1909
- Mahatha Ng & Tay, 2001
- Mainitia Bott, 1969
- Maydelliathelphusa Bott, 1969
- Mekhongthelphusa Naiyanetr, 1994
- Migmathelphusa Chia & Ng, 2006
- Naduganiana Pati, 2025
- Natunusa Ng & Guinot, 2026
- Nautilothelphusa Balss, 1933
- Niahusa Ng, 2025
- Niasathelphusa Ng, 1991
- Nilgiriana Pati, 2025
- Occulthusa Ng & Wowor, 2018
- Oziotelphusa Müller, 1887
- Palaniana Pati, 2025
- Parathelphusa H. Milne Edwards, 1854
- Pastilla Ng & Tay, 2001
- Patithelphusa Mitra, Rath, Jung, Kim & Kundu, 2025
- Pavizham Raj, Kumar & Ng, 2022
- Perbrinckia Bott, 1969
- Perithelphusa De Man, 1899
- Phricotelphusa Alcock, 1909
- Pilarta Bahir & Yeo, 2007
- Ponmudiana Pati, 2025
- Pusillosa Pati, 2025
- Rajathelphusa Raj, Kumar & Ng, 2021
- Rouxana Bott, 1969
- Sahyadriana Pati & Thackeray, 2018
- Salangathelphusa Bott, 1968
- Samudrusa Ng, 2025
- Santanusus Pati, 2025
- Sartoriana Bott, 1969
- Sayamia Naiyanetr, 1994
- Sendleria Bott, 1969
- Siamthelphusa Bott, 1968
- Snaha Bahir & Yeo, 2007
- Sodhiana Yeo & Ng, 2012
- Somanniathelphusa Bott, 1968
- Spiralothelphusa Bott, 1968
- Stygothelphusa Ng, 1989
- Sundathelphusa Bott, 1969
- Syntripsa Chia & Ng, 2006
- Terrathelphusa Ng, 1989
- Thaksinthelphusa Ng & Naiyanetr, 1993
- Thelphusula Bott, 1969
- Torhusa Ng, 1997
- Travancoriana Bott, 1969
- Vanni Bahir & Yeo, 2007
- Vela Bahir & Yeo, 2007
