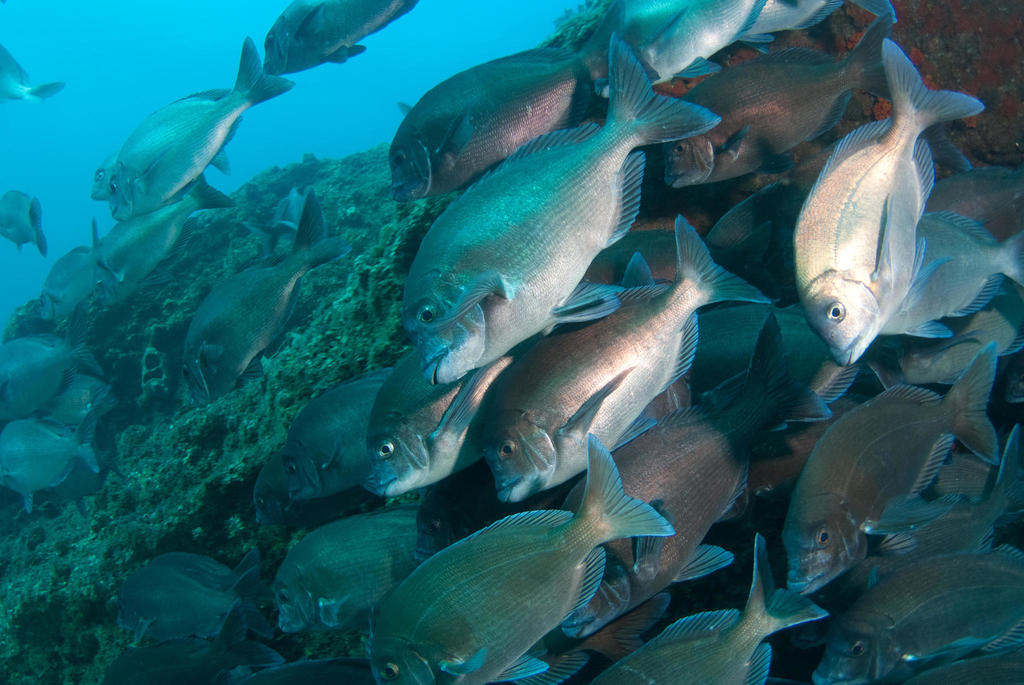

Conservation status
- Least Concern (IUCN 3.1)

Scientific classification
- Kingdom: Animalia
- Phylum: Chordata
- Class: Actinopterygii
- Order: Acanthuriformes
- Family: Sparidae
- Genus: Polyamblyodon
- Species: P. germanum

Binomial name
- Polyamblyodon germanum (Barnard, 1934)

Synonyms
- Pachymetopon germanum Barnard, 1934

= Polyamblyodon germanum =

Species of fish

Polyamblyodon germanum, the German seabream, is a species of marine ray-finned fish in the family Sparidae, which includes the seabreams and porgies. This species is found in the southwestern Indian Ocean.

== Taxonomy ==
Polyamblyodon germanum was first formally described as Pachymetopon germanum in 1934 by the South African zoologist Keppel Harcourt Barnard with its type locality given as Durban in KwaZulu-Natal. in 1935 John Roxborough Norman proposed Polyamblyodon as a new monospecific genus and designated Pachymetopon germanum as its type species. The genus Polyamblyodon is placed in the family Sparidae within the order Spariformes by the 5th edition of Fishes of the World. Some authorities classify this genus in the subfamily Boopsinae, but the 5th edition of Fishes of the World does not recognise subfamilies within the Sparidae.

== Etymology ==
Polyamblyodon germanum has the specific name germanum which was not explained by Barnard, it may mean "having the same parents". This may be because Barnard was comparing this species to its presumed congeners in the genus in Pachymetopon, P. gibbosus and P. grande.

== Description ==
Polyamblyodon germanum has an moderately deep, ovoid, compressed body which has a depth that fits into its standard length between 2.2 and 2.5 times. It has a blunt snout with a steep concave dorsal profile between the snout and the hump in front of the eyes then slightly convex to the nape, the angle of the hump sharpening as the fish ages. The pelvic fin extends as far as the anus. The overall colour is blue-grey to bronze, lightening in colour ventrally with the darkest colour being on the forehead, cheeks and fins. The dorsal fin is supported 11 spines and 11 or 12 soft rays while there are 3 spines and 10 or 11 soft rays supporting the anal fin. This species has a maximum published total length of 45 cm (18 in).

== Distribution and habitat ==
Polyamblyodon germanum is endemic to Southern Africa where it is found from Maputo in Mozambique to Algoa Bay in the Eastern Cape. It is found at depths between 40 and 80 m (130 and 260 ft) over reefs.

== Biology ==
Polyamblyodon germanum feeds on benthic invertebrates such as tunicates, molluscs and crustaceans. Otherwise the biology of this species is little known.

== Fisheries ==
Polyamblyodon germanum is mainly caught by angling from ski boats, at depths between 15 and 50 m (49 and 164 ft) on rocky reefs. It is taken by commercial and recreational line fisheries in KwaZulu-Natal and the Eastern Cape where this species makes up less than 1% of the total landings.
