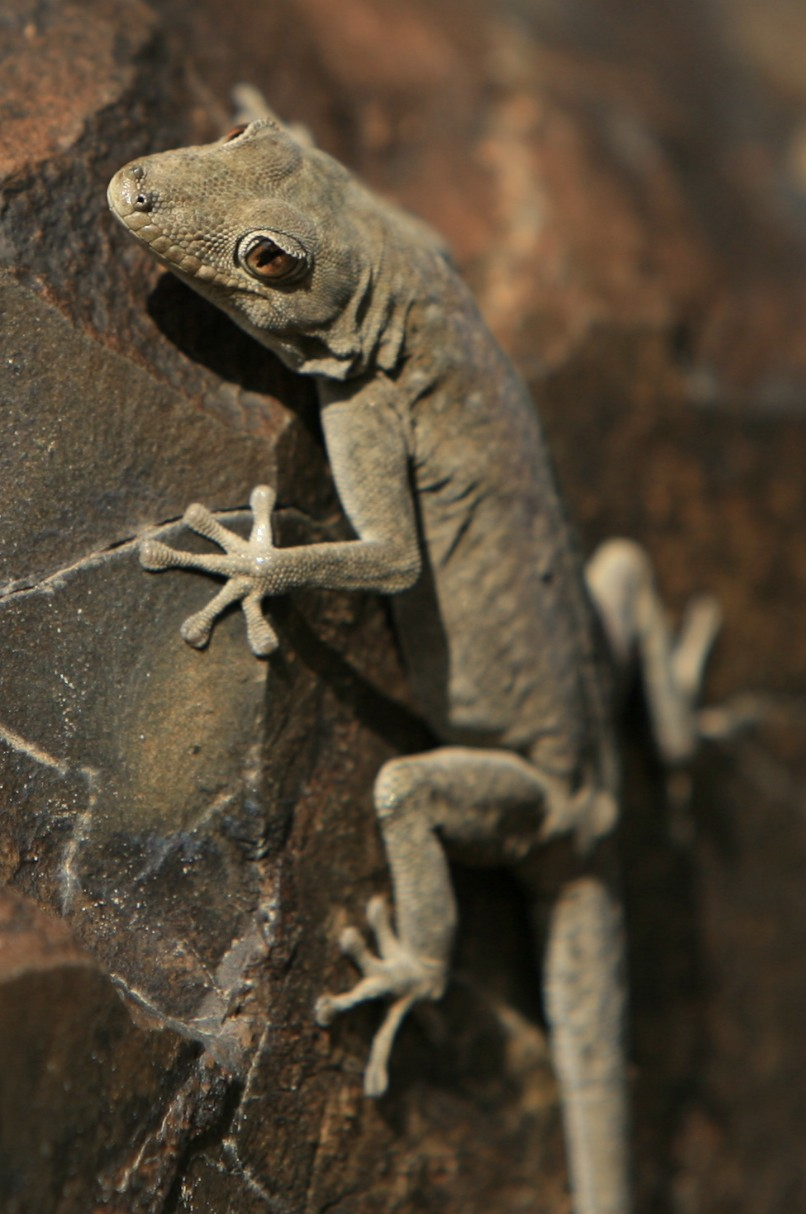
- A Bradfield's Namib day gecko on a rock, Namibia, 2008

Conservation status
- Least Concern (IUCN 3.1)

Scientific classification
- Kingdom: Animalia
- Phylum: Chordata
- Class: Reptilia
- Order: Squamata
- Suborder: Gekkota
- Family: Gekkonidae
- Genus: Rhoptropus
- Species: R. bradfieldi

Binomial name
- Rhoptropus bradfieldi Hewitt, 1935

= Rhoptropus bradfieldi =

Species of lizard

Bradfield's Namib day gecko (Rhoptropus bradfieldi) is a species of lizard in the family Gekkonidae. The species is endemic to Namibia. This species was first described in 1935 by the British-born, South African zoologist John Hewitt, who gave it the name Rhoptropus bradfieldi in honour of the South African naturalist and collector R.D. Bradfield (1882–1949).

== Description ==
Rhoptropus bradfieldi has a maximum snout-to-vent length (SVL) of 74 mm (2.9 in), and a total length (including tail) of about 100 to 130 mm (4 to 5 in). The dorsal surface is greyish-brown, indistinctly barred and dappled, and the ventral surface is bluish-grey. There are eleven scansors (specialist structures for adhesion) under the middle toe. This gecko is similar in appearance to the Namib day gecko (Rhoptropus afer), but that species is slightly smaller, has bright yellow underparts and only six scansors under the middle digit. The difference in scansor number between the two species, and the much shorter setae from which the scansors are formed in R. afer, are reflected in different lifestyles; R. bradfieldi, with more-adhesive feet, is a crevice-dweller with a slow, climbing lifestyle, while R. afer is much more terrestrial, running rapidly on the ground and jumping from rock to rock.

== Distribution and habitat ==
Rhoptropus bradfieldi is endemic to Namibia. Its typical habitat is rocks and boulders in arid regions of the Namib Desert.

== Ecology ==
Rhoptropus bradfieldi is a diurnal lizard and is an ambush predator of small arthropods such as ants, moths, and beetles. Its body is maintained at a high but steady temperature while it is active. It has a low field metabolic rate, about 26% of that of other desert lizards, but a relatively high water intake, which it probably fulfils from the fogs that often occur near the coast.

== Reproduction ==
R. bradfieldi is oviparous. Clutch size is two eggs, and each egg measures about 15 mm × 9 mm (0.59 in × 0.35 in).
