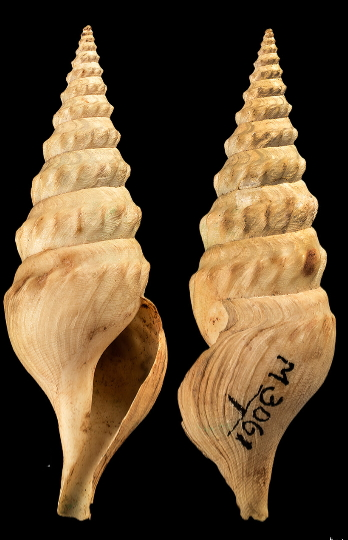
- Shell of Leucosyrinx margaritae (holotype)

Scientific classification
- Kingdom: Animalia
- Phylum: Mollusca
- Class: Gastropoda
- Subclass: Caenogastropoda
- Order: Neogastropoda
- Superfamily: Conoidea
- Family: Pseudomelatomidae
- Genus: Leucosyrinx
- Species: L. margaritae

Binomial name
- Leucosyrinx margaritae (E. A. Smith, 1904)

Synonyms
- Comitas margaritae (E. A. Smith, 1904); Pleurotoma (Surcula) margaritae E. A. Smith, 1904 (basionym); Pleurotoma margaritae E. A. Smith, 1904 (original combination)

= Leucosyrinx margaritae =

Species of gastropod

Leucosyrinx margaritae is a species of sea snail, a marine gastropod mollusk in the family Pseudomelatomidae, the turrids and allies.

Judging from the figure, K.H. Barnard thought this species almost indistinguishable from Comitas stolida (Hinds, 1843)

== Description ==
The length of the shell of the holotype attains 60 mm, its diameter 20 mm.

(Original description in Latin) The species is moderately variable in shell outline and sculpture pattern.

The shell is fusiform and turreted. It is whitish in color, covered by a very thin yellowish periostracum. The spire is elongated and acuminate. The shell consists of 12 whorls, each angulated at the middle and ornamented with oblique nodose axial folds that become attenuated toward the lower suture. The subsutural region is concave, whereas the lower portion of each whorl is slightly convex. The entire shell is sculptured with fine, closely spaced spiral striae and delicate, flexuous growth lines. The body whorl is convex below the shoulder and terminates anteriorly in a short siphonal canal.

The aperture is elongate and pyriform. The outer lip is thin, strongly arcuate, and projects forward, with a broad and deep anal sinus situated at its upper part. The columella is nearly straight in its middle portion and becomes oblique anteriorly.

(More recent description by Kantor et al.) The shell is large, reaching up to 60 mm in length. It has a fusiform shape, with a high spire. It is thin but solid, and ranges in color from very light yellowish to tan. The protoconch is small, paucispiral, and composed of approximately 1.5 smooth, evenly convex, rounded whorls. The upper teleoconch whorls are distinctly angulated at the shoulder, whereas in larger specimens the body whorl becomes nearly evenly rounded, with the shoulder only weakly accentuated by an obtuse keel. The subsutural ramp is distinctly concave on the upper whorls but may become nearly flat on the body whorl.

The teleoconch whorls bear strong, oblique, broad, rounded axial folds on the shoulder. These folds fade across the subsutural ramp and weaken markedly toward the lower suture, failing to reach it on the penultimate whorl in large specimens. On the body whorl and the posterior part of the penultimate whorl, the folds progressively weaken toward the aperture. In the largest specimen examined 14 axial folds were present on the body whorl.

The spiral sculpture is moderately developed. It is nearly absent on the subsutural ramp but becomes more distinct below the shoulder, where it consists of low, rounded, undulating spiral cords of variable width. The intervals between the cords are equal to or greater than the width of the cords themselves. The shell base ranges from strongly to weakly convex and passes smoothly into a long siphonal canal. The aperture is narrow, elongate-oval, and poorly differentiated from the siphonal canal. The anal sinus is deep, subsutural, and broadly arcuate, extending across the subsutural ramp and becoming confluent with the broad forward projection of the outer lip.

The radula is morphologically similar in both examined specimens. The marginal teeth are duplex and measure approximately 195–390 μm in length (2.8–3.1% of aperture length excluding the siphonal canal). The major limb is moderately narrow, lanceolate in dorsal view, and distinctly curved. The accessory limb constitutes approximately one-half of the total tooth width and is inserted into a distinct, moderately deep socket on the dorsal side of the major limb.

== Distribution ==
This marine species occurs off the Andaman and Nicobar Islands, off Java, to the Philippines, Papua New Guinea, and in the Solomon Sea, at depths between 565 m and 944 m.
