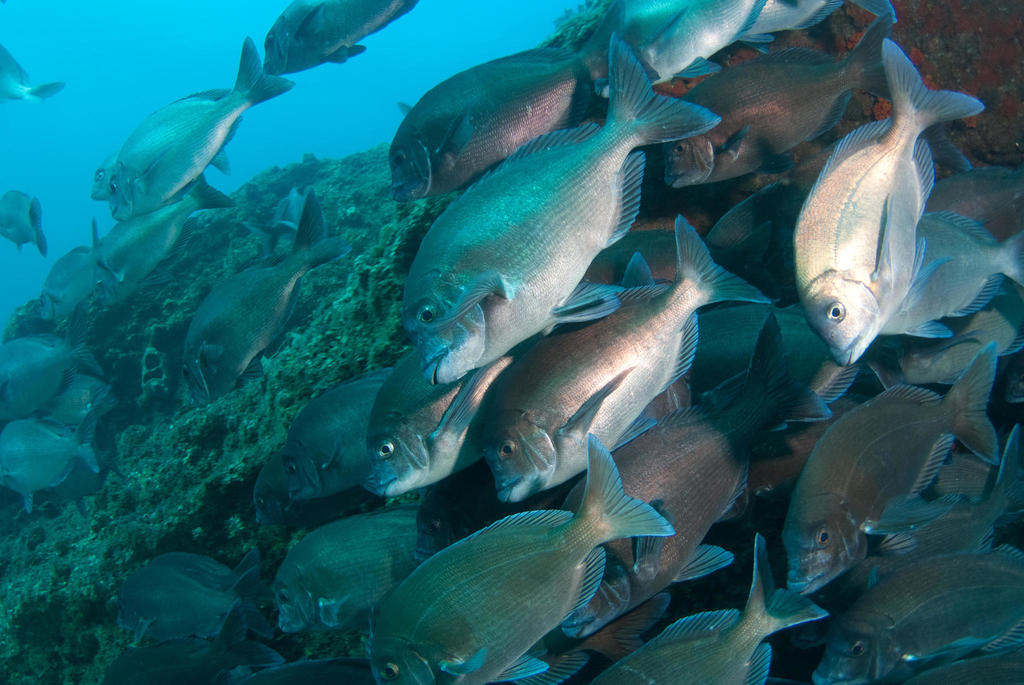
- German seabream (Polyamblyodon germanum) Aliwal Shoal

Scientific classification
- Kingdom: Animalia
- Phylum: Chordata
- Class: Actinopterygii
- Division: Teleostei
- Order: Acanthuriformes
- Family: Sparidae
- Genus: Polyamblyodon; Norman, 1934

Type species
- Pachymetopon germanum Barnard, 1934

= Polyamblyodon =

Genus of fishes

Polyamblyodon is a genus of marin ray-finned fishes belonging to the family Sparidae, which includes the seabreams and porgies. The fishes in this genus are found in the Western Indian Ocean.

== Taxonomy ==
Polyamblyodon was first proposed as a genus in 1935 by the English ichthyologist John Roxborough Norman with Pachymetopon germanum as its type species. P. germanum was first formally described in 1935 by the South African zoologist Keppel Harcourt Barnard with its type locality given as Durban in KwaZulu-Natal. This genus is placed in the family Sparidae within the order Spariformes by the 5th edition of Fishes of the World. Some authorities classify this genus in the subfamily Boopsinae, but the 5th edition of Fishes of the World does not recognise subfamilies within the Sparidae.

== Etymology ==
Polyambylodon is a compound of poly, meaning "many" with amblys, meaning "blunt", and odon, meaning "tooth", a reference to what Normnan, referring to the German seabream, described as “outer row of strong, curved, compressed chisel-like teeth in each jaw, behind which is a broad band composed of 6 or 7 rows of small rounded molariform teeth”.

== Species ==
Polyamblyodon contains two recognised species:

- Polyamblyodon germanum (Barnard, 1934) (German seabream)
- Polyamblyodon gibbosum (Pellegrin, 1914) (Knife-back seabream)

== Characteristics ==
Polyamblyodon seabreams are characterised by having an outer row of incisor-like teeth, none of which are enlarged at the front, with a thick band of small, rounded teeth behind them. The space between the eyes has no scales but the bases of the soft rayed part of the dorsal and anal fins both have a dense covering of scales. The largest species is P. gibbosum which has a maximum total length of 60 cm (24 in).

== Distribution ==
Polyamblyodon seabreams are found in the southwestern Indian Ocean, and marginally in the southeastern Atlantic Ocean, off the coasts of South Africa, Mozambique and Madagascar.
