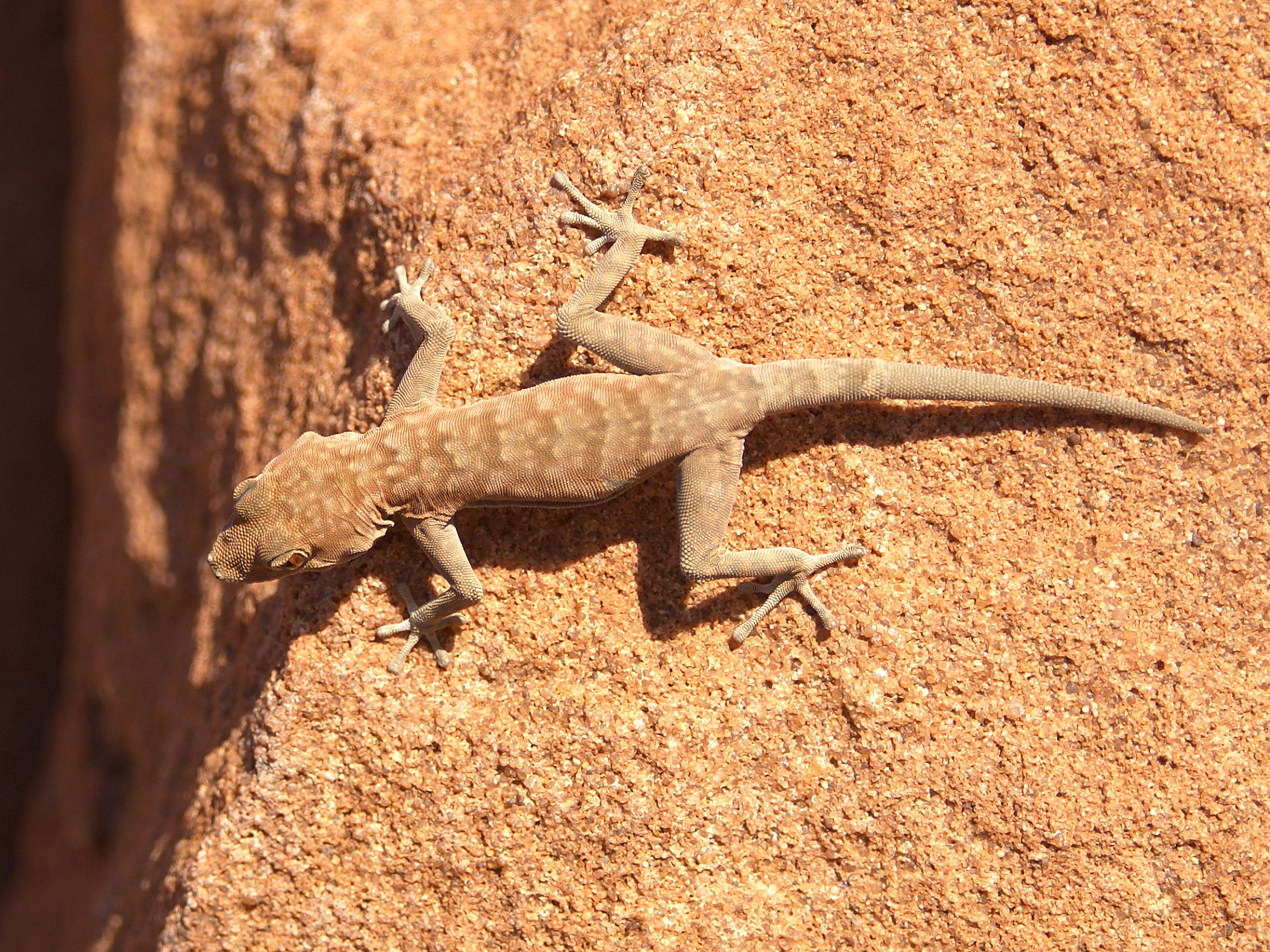
- Rhoptropus diporus at Twyfelfontein, Namibia

Scientific classification
- Domain: Eukaryota
- Kingdom: Animalia
- Phylum: Chordata
- Class: Reptilia
- Order: Squamata
- Infraorder: Gekkota
- Family: Gekkonidae
- Subfamily: Uroplatinae
- Genus: Rhoptropus; W. Peters, 1869

= Rhoptropus =

Genus of lizards

Rhoptropus is a genus of geckos endemic to Southern Africa, better known as Namib day geckos.

== Classification of genus Rhoptropus ==
The following species are recognized:

- Rhoptropus afer W. Peters, 1869 — Namib day gecko
- Rhoptropus barnardi Hewitt, 1926 — Barnard's Namib day gecko
- Rhoptropus benguellensis Mertens, 1938 — Benguela day gecko
- Rhoptropus biporosus V. FitzSimons, 1957
- Rhoptropus boultoni K.P. Schmidt, 1933 — Boulton's Namib day gecko
- Rhoptropus bradfieldi Hewitt, 1935
- Rhoptropus diporus Haacke, 1965
- Rhoptropus montanus Laurent, 1964 — mountain day gecko
- Rhoptropus taeniostictus Laurent, 1964
