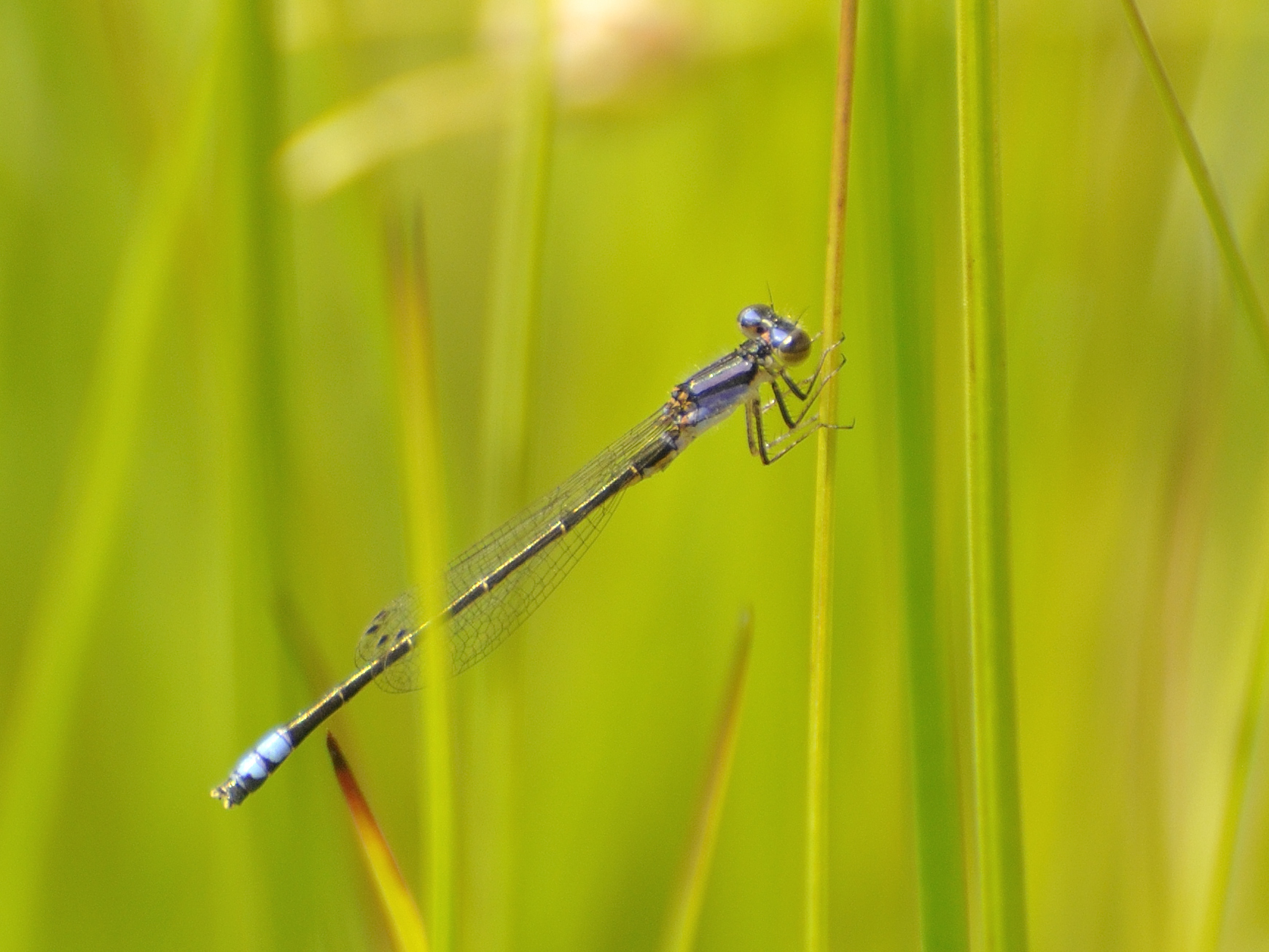

Conservation status
- Endangered (IUCN 3.1)

Scientific classification
- Kingdom: Animalia
- Phylum: Arthropoda
- Clade: Pancrustacea
- Class: Insecta
- Order: Odonata
- Suborder: Zygoptera
- Family: Coenagrionidae
- Genus: Proischnura
- Species: P. polychromatica

Binomial name
- Proischnura polychromatica (Barnard, 1937)

Synonyms
- Enallagma polychromaticum Barnard, 1937; Proischnura polychromaticum Barnard, 1937

= Proischnura polychromatica =

Species of damselfly

Proischnura polychromatica, the mauve bluet, is a small species of damselfly in the family Coenagrionidae. It is endemic to a small area of Cape Province in South Africa. The adult male has a mauve sheen to its dark-coloured body, a bronze-green thorax striped with mauve, and a pale brown abdomen with a bronze-green dorsal stripe. The female is mainly pale brown. The natural habitat of this damselfly is transient pools in stream beds with floating vegetation, especially sedges. Although previously more widespread, it is now known from a single location where it is threatened by the encroachment of cattle and the loss of suitable habitat. For these reasons, the International Union for Conservation of Nature has rated it as "endangered".

== Description ==
The adult mauve bluet is a very small damselfly, with a distinctive bluish-mauve/violet colouration on an overall black body. The face is mauve and black, the top of the head deep bronze green. The eyes are dark grey above and light grey below. The mauve postocular spots are wedge-shaped and connected with a thin mauve line. The thorax is dark bronze green with mauve stripes. The wings are round with reddish-brown pterostigmata. The light brown abdomen has a bronze green dorsal stripe between segments 1 and 7. The tip of the abdomen (segments 8 and 9), is mauve. The female is light brown with a small dark blue spot on segment 9.

== Distribution and habitat ==
The species is endemic to South Africa, where it is restricted to a small area in the Western Cape Province. Its natural habitat is rivers, where it frequents drying pools in stream- and riverbeds that have floating vegetation and an abundance of sedges.

== Conservation ==
The species is classified as endangered by the IUCN. After not being recorded between 1963 and 2002, it is now only known from two localities. One of the sites is under threat from encroachment by cattle, and the species in general is believed to be impacted by loss of suitable habitat and the proliferation of invasive vegetation.
