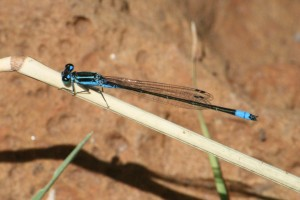

Conservation status
- Least Concern (IUCN 3.1)

Scientific classification
- Kingdom: Animalia
- Phylum: Arthropoda
- Class: Insecta
- Order: Odonata
- Suborder: Zygoptera
- Family: Coenagrionidae
- Genus: Proischnura
- Species: P. subfurcata

Binomial name
- Proischnura subfurcata (Selys, 1876)

= Proischnura subfurcata =

Species of damselfly

Proischnura subfurcata is a species of damselfly in the family Coenagrionidae. It is found in Ethiopia, Kenya, Malawi, Nigeria, South Africa, Tanzania, Uganda, and possibly Burundi. Its natural habitats are subtropical or tropical high-altitude grassland, freshwater marshes, and intermittent freshwater marshes.
