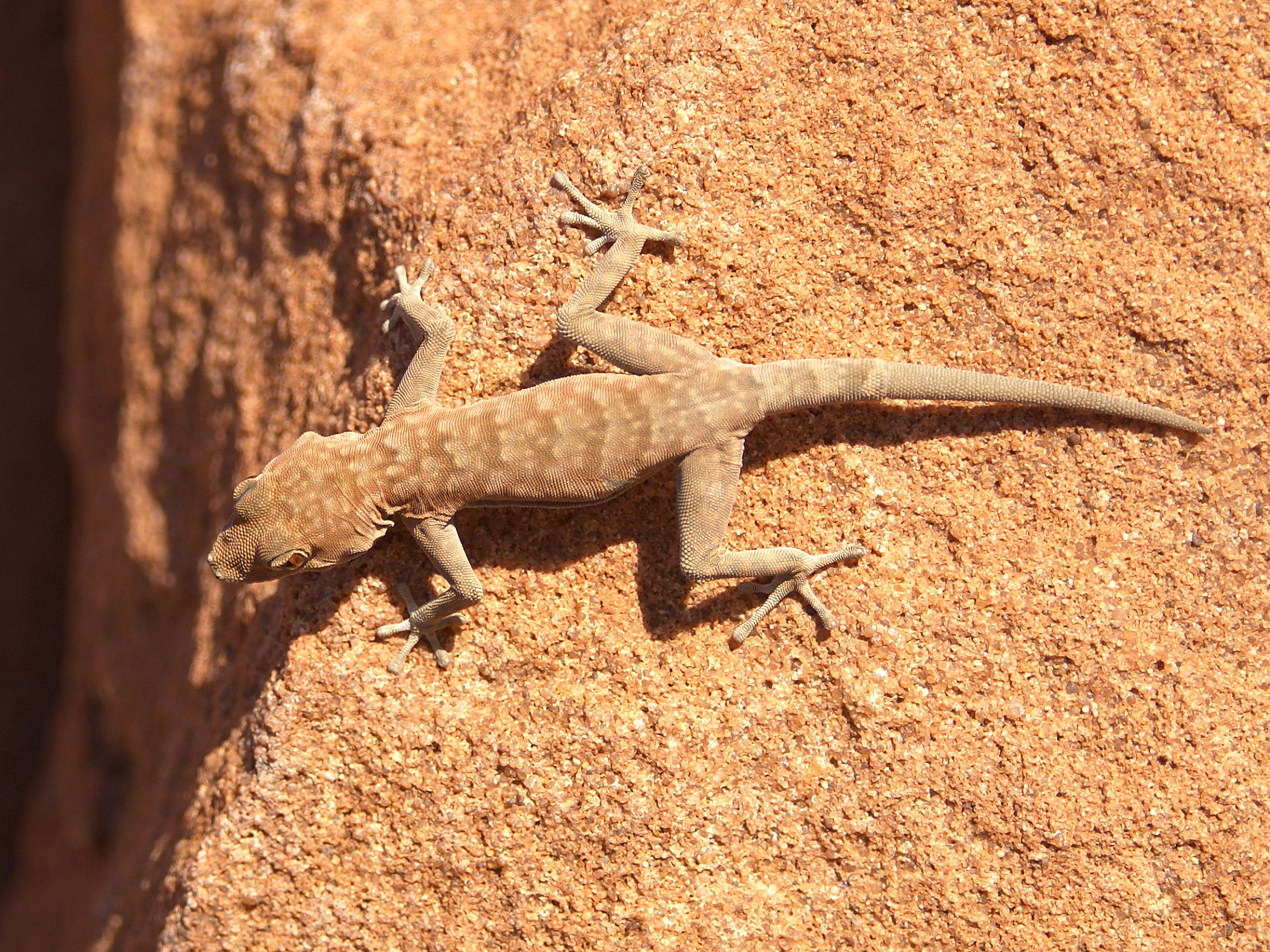

Conservation status
- Least Concern (IUCN 3.1)

Scientific classification
- Kingdom: Animalia
- Phylum: Chordata
- Class: Reptilia
- Order: Squamata
- Suborder: Gekkota
- Family: Gekkonidae
- Genus: Rhoptropus
- Species: R. diporus

Binomial name
- Rhoptropus diporus Haacke, 1965

Synonyms
- Rhoptropus bradfieldi diporus

= Rhoptropus diporus =

Species of lizard

Rhoptropus diporus is a species of lizard in the family Gekkonidae. The species is endemic to Namibia.
