= Blackback barb =

Conservation status
- Least Concern (IUCN 3.1)

Scientific classification
- Kingdom: Animalia
- Phylum: Chordata
- Class: Actinopterygii
- Order: Cypriniformes
- Family: Cyprinidae
- Subfamily: Smiliogastrinae
- Genus: Enteromius
- Species: E. barnardi

Binomial name
- Enteromius barnardi R. A. Jubb, 1965

Synonyms
- Barbus barnardi Jubb, 1965

Species of fish

The blackback barb (Enteromius barnardi) is a species of cyprinid fish native to Africa where it is known to occur in shallow, vegetated waters of the Zambezi River system, the Cunene River system and the Zambian portion of the Congo River system.

== Size ==
This species reaches a length of 7 cm (2.8 in).

== Etymology ==
The fish is named in honor of Keppel Harcourt Barnard (1887–1964) of the South African Museum, because of his contributions to the taxonomy of South African fishes.

== Economic Value ==
It is also found in the aquarium trade.
