= Colophon izardi =

Conservation status
- Near Threatened (IUCN 2.3)

Scientific classification
- Kingdom: Animalia
- Phylum: Arthropoda
- Class: Insecta
- Order: Coleoptera
- Suborder: Polyphaga
- Infraorder: Scarabaeiformia
- Family: Lucanidae
- Genus: Colophon
- Species: C. izardi

Binomial name
- Colophon izardi Barnard, 1929

Species of beetle

Colophon izardi is a species of beetle in family Lucanidae. It is endemic to South Africa.
