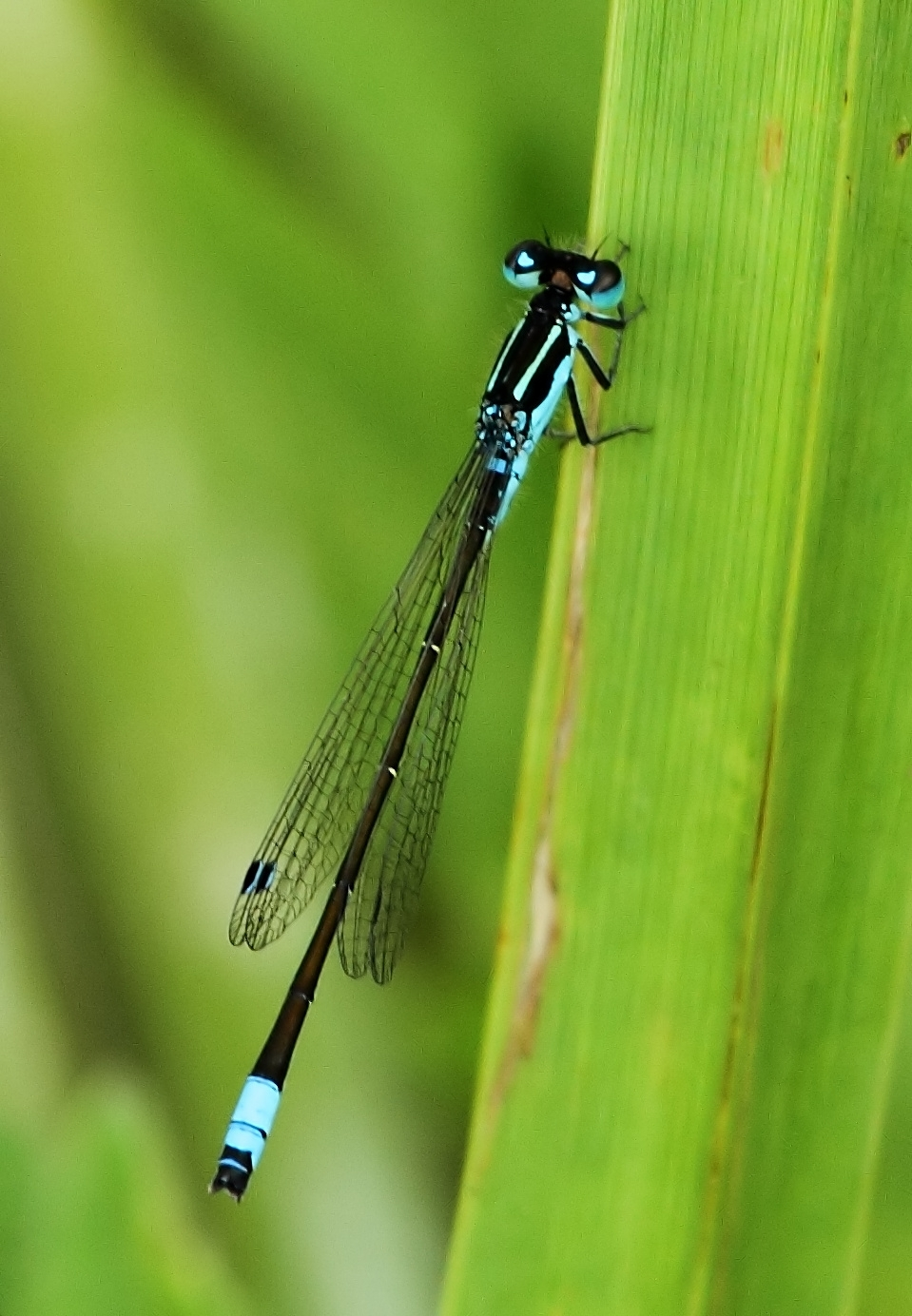
- Male

Conservation status
- Least Concern (IUCN 3.1)

Scientific classification
- Kingdom: Animalia
- Phylum: Arthropoda
- Class: Insecta
- Order: Odonata
- Suborder: Zygoptera
- Family: Coenagrionidae
- Genus: Proischnura
- Species: P. rotundipennis

Binomial name
- Proischnura rotundipennis Ris, 1921

= Proischnura rotundipennis =

Species of damselfly

Proischnura rotundipennis, the round-winged bluet is a species of damselfly in the family Coenagrionidae. It is endemic to South Africa, where it is scarce and localised.

This species is found in the grassland biome, where its natural habitat is grassy verges of ponds and slow-flowing streams.

This bluet is 22–27 mm long, with a wingspan of 30–32 mm. The thorax is greenish blue with black dorsal and antehumeral stripes. The upper abdomen is mainly black; segments eight and nine are bright blue and segment ten is black. Key features for identification in the field are rounded wing-tips and the short, broad pterostigmata which are dark with pale edges.

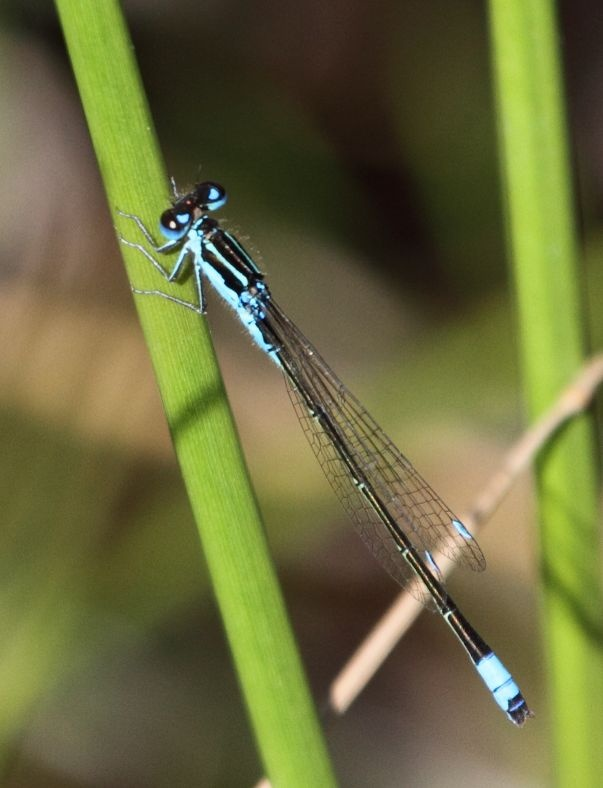
Male

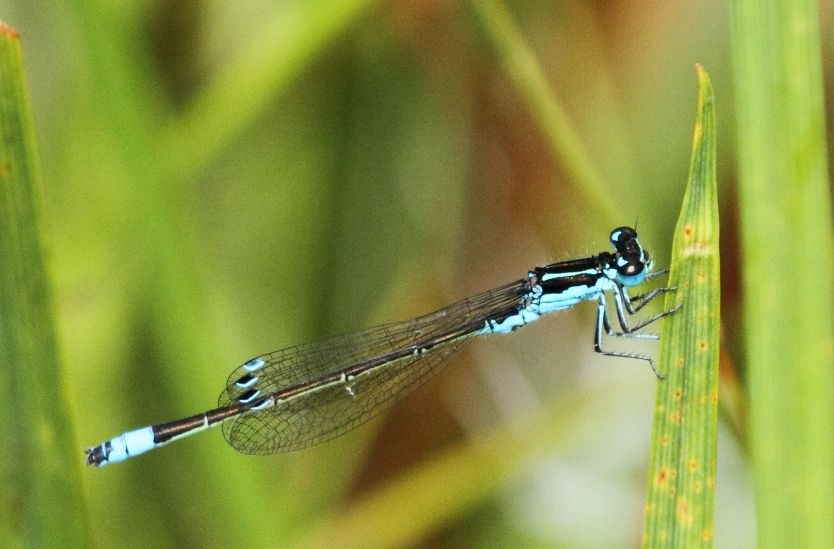
Male

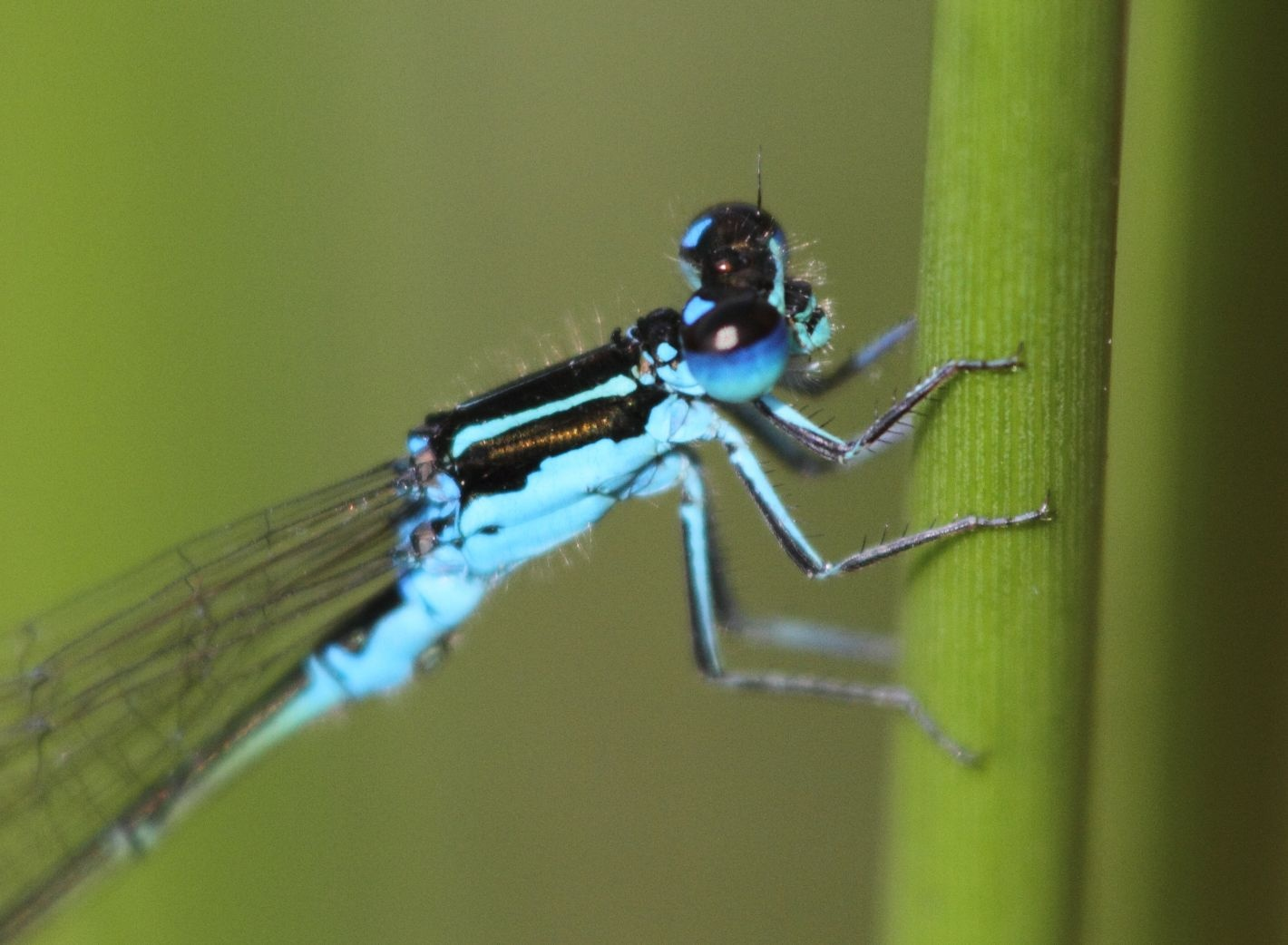
Male head and thorax

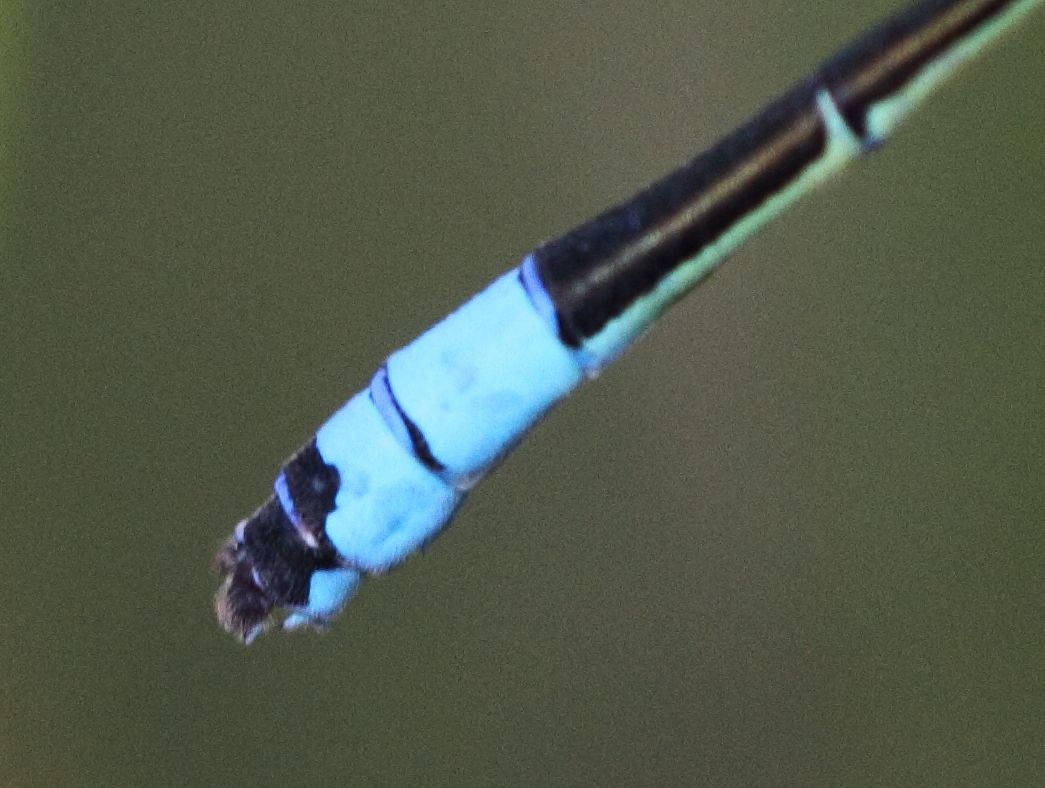
Male abdomen

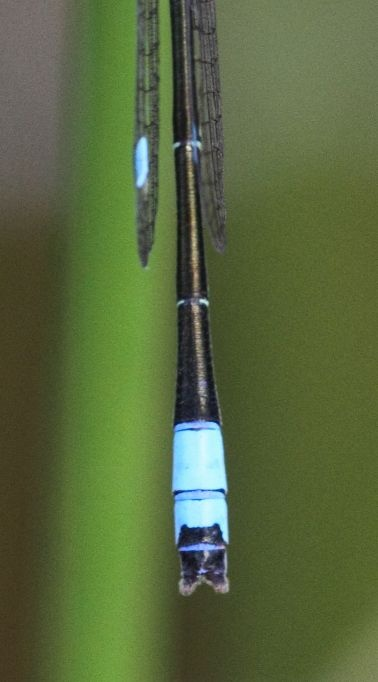
Male abdomen

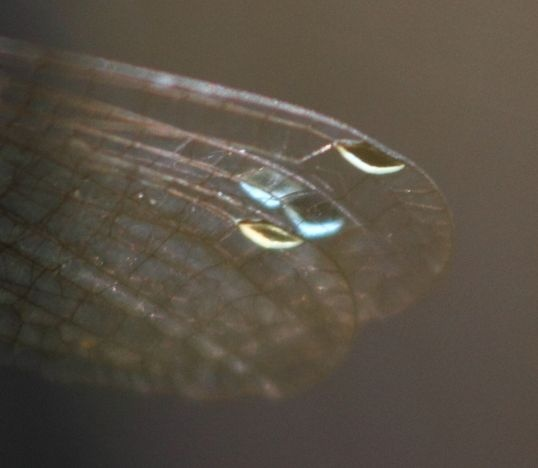
Male wing detail showing pterostigmata

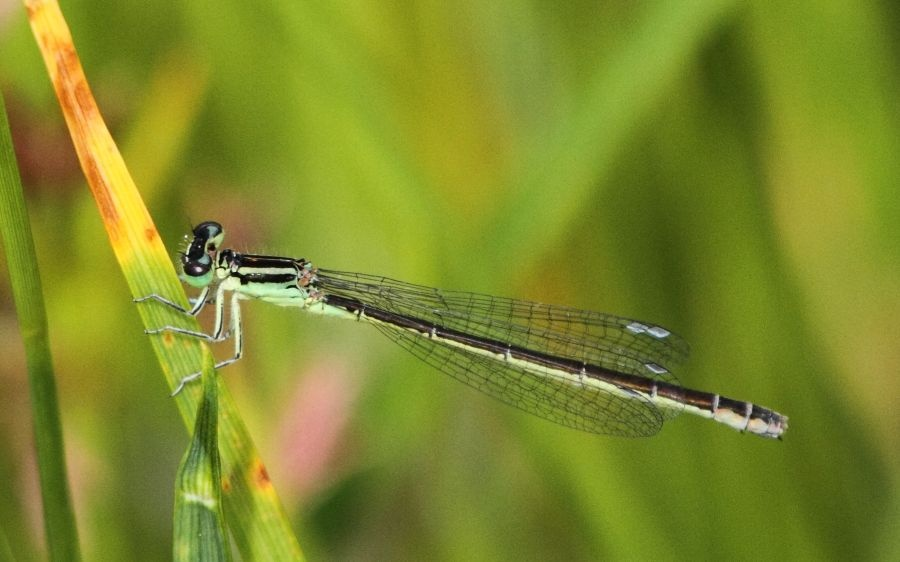
Female

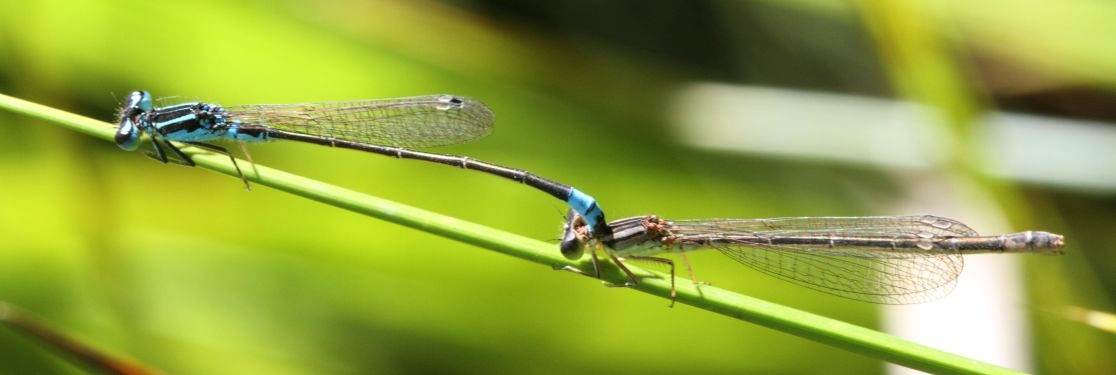
Mating pair
