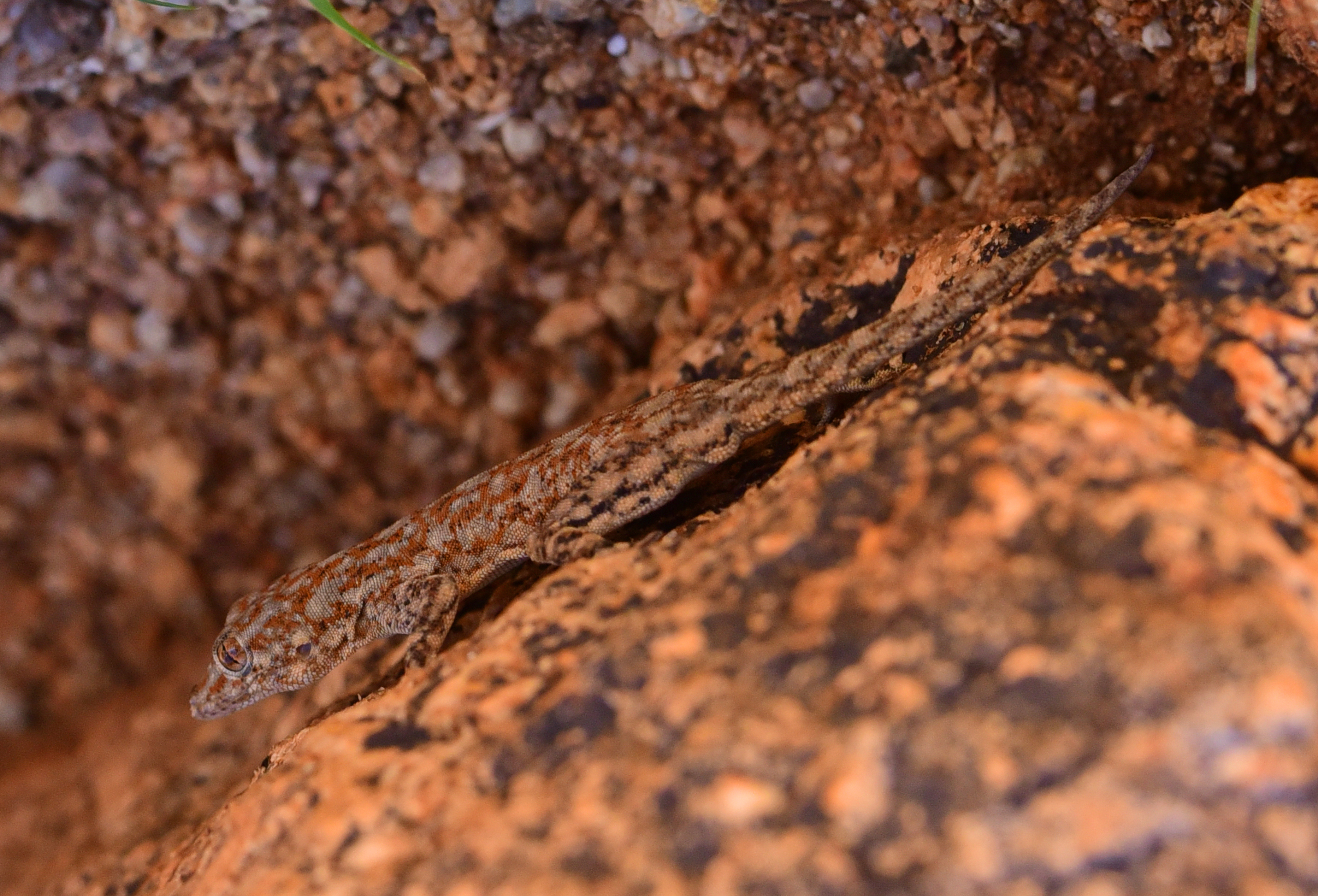

Conservation status
- Least Concern (IUCN 3.1)

Scientific classification
- Kingdom: Animalia
- Phylum: Chordata
- Class: Reptilia
- Order: Squamata
- Suborder: Gekkota
- Family: Gekkonidae
- Genus: Rhoptropus
- Species: R. barnardi

Binomial name
- Rhoptropus barnardi Hewitt, 1926

= Barnard's Namib day gecko =

Species of lizard

Barnard's Namib day gecko (Rhoptropus barnardi), also known commonly as Barnard's slender gecko, is a species of lizard in the family Gekkonidae. The species is native to southern Africa.

== Etymology ==
The specific name, barnardi, is in honor of South African zoologist Keppel Harcourt Barnard.

== Distribution and habitat ==
R. barnardi is found in Angola and Namibia.

The preferred natural habitats of R. barnardi are savanna and rocky areas, at altitudes of 200–1,900 m (660–6,230 ft).

== Description ==
R. barnardi is the smallest species in its genus. Adults usually have a snout-to-vent length (SVL) of 3.0–4.5 cm (1.2–1.8 in). The maximum recorded SVL is 4.9 cm (1.9 in).

== Biology ==
R. barnardi is oviparous. Clutch size is two eggs. Each egg measures on average 11.5 mm × 9.5 mm (0.45 in × 0.37 in). Communal nesting sites may contain as many as 200 eggs.
