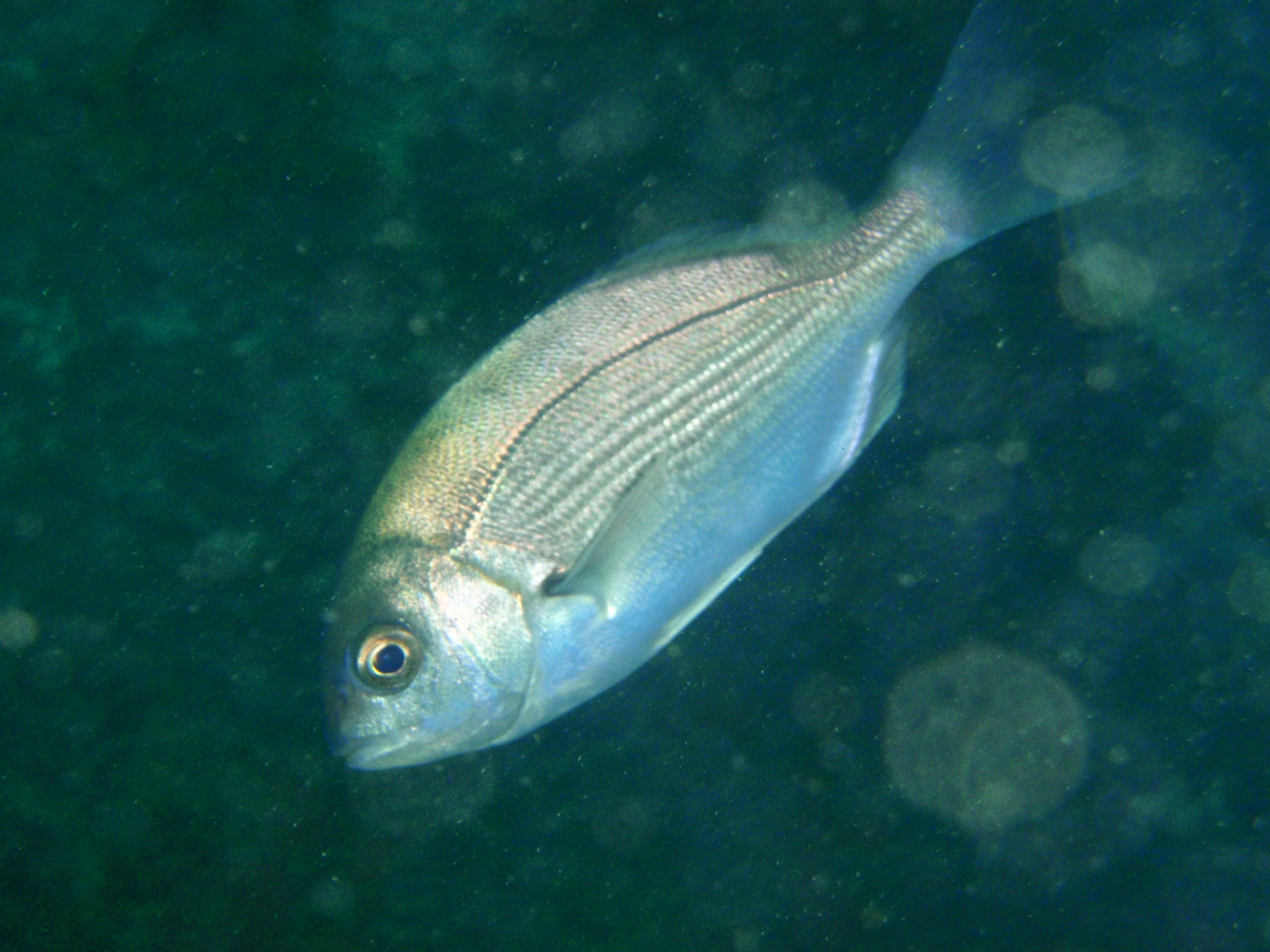

Conservation status
- Least Concern (IUCN 3.1)

Scientific classification
- Kingdom: Animalia
- Phylum: Chordata
- Class: Actinopterygii
- Order: Acanthuriformes
- Family: Sparidae
- Genus: Pachymetopon
- Species: P. blochii

Binomial name
- Pachymetopon blochii (Valenciennes, 1830)

Synonyms
- Cantharus blochii Valenciennes, 1830; Cantharus castelnaui Bleeker, 1859; Caranthus blochii (Valenciennes, 1830); Pachymetopon canescens Norman, 1935

= Pachymetopon blochii =

Species of sea bream from South Africa

Pachymetopon blochii, the hottentot seabream or hottentot, is a species of sea bream in the family Sparidae, native to the southwestern coast of Africa.

== Description ==
Pachymetopon blochii has a bronzy grey color, with darker fins. The small mouth contains five rows of incisors in both upper and lower jaw, but no molars. Adults are commonly around 25 cm in length at the age of maturity, but may reach up to 54 cm, with a maximum recorded weight of 2.67 kg.

== Distribution and habitat ==
The species occurs in the southeastern Atlantic, from Angola to Cape Agulhas at the southern tip of South Africa. Vagrants have been recorded as far east as the mouth of the Tsitsikamma River.

Pachymetopon blochii inhabits kelp beds on shallow rocky reefs, as well as blinders, subtidal reefs and offshore pinnacles in deeper waters (up to 55 m). Juveniles are restricted to the kelp beds.

== Ecology ==
The species is a generalist and feeds on seaweeds, algae, crustaceans, worms, molluscs, sea urchins, and occasionally small fish. It may spawn all year round, with peaks in summer and winter. Individuals generally live to an age of about 12 years, but may exceptionally reach an age of up to 21 years. Generation length is about 9 years.

Pachymetopon blochii is a frequent host of the parasitic isopod Anilocra capensis.

== Conservation ==
Pachymetopon blochii is an important species in a variety of smaller-scale fisheries (artisanal linefishery, recreational shore and ski-boat fishery) and occurs as bycatch in gill-net fishery. However, it appears not to be exploited to an extent that is damaging stocks, and is common in a number of protected areas in its range. It is therefore classified as Least Concern by the IUCN.
