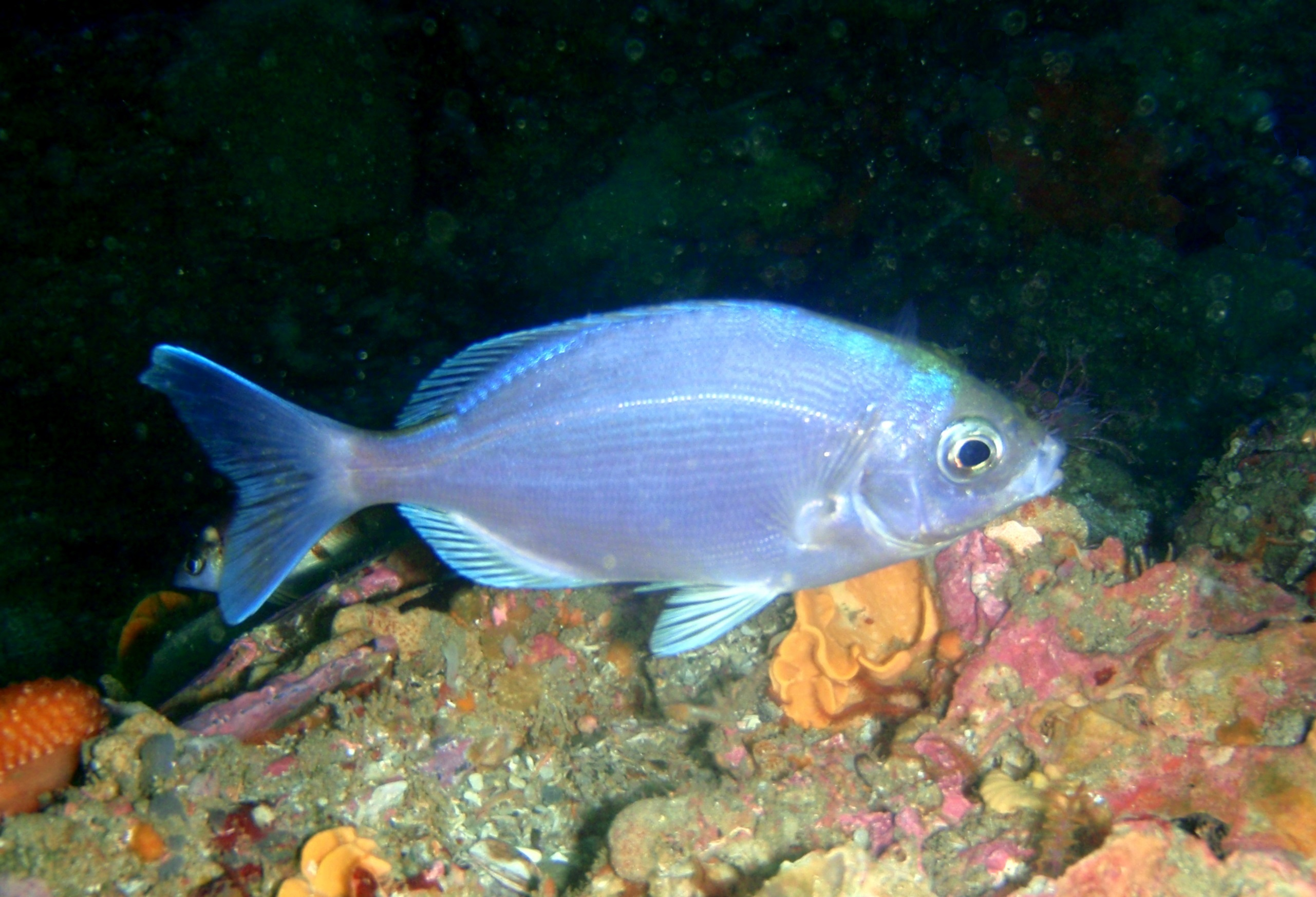
- At Rheeder's Reef, Tsitsikamma

Conservation status
- Least Concern (IUCN 3.1)

Scientific classification
- Kingdom: Animalia
- Phylum: Chordata
- Class: Actinopterygii
- Order: Acanthuriformes
- Family: Sparidae
- Genus: Pachymetopon
- Species: P. aeneum

Binomial name
- Pachymetopon aeneum (Gilchrist & W. W. Thompson, 1908)

Synonyms
- Cantharus aeneus Gilchrist & W. W. Thompson, 1908; Cantharus natalensis Gilchrist & W. W. Thompson, 1908; Cantharus simus Gilchrist & W. W. Thompson, 1909

= Pachymetopon aeneum =

Blue hottentot

Species of seabream endemic to South Africa

Pachymetopon aeneum, the blue hottentot, is a species of marine demersal ray-finned fish belonging to the family (family Sparidae) which includes the seabreams and porgies. It is endemic to the south and east coasts of South Africa.

== Distribution ==
Only known from False Bay to Sodwana Bay. Depth range usually from 20 to 50 m. Subtropical, from 28°S to 34°S.

== Description ==
A silvery bronze fish, streaked with blue, with a darker blue head, and with the head shorter than body depth. The blues fade after death. There are 2.2 to 2.5 depths to the standard length, and the pectoral fins are longer than the head. The snout profile is slightly concave in adult males, and a there is characteristic bulge between the eyes. The lateral line smoothly follows the curve of the back. The fish has a small mouth with five rows of incisors in each jaw, and no molars. The dorsal fin is soft, with 10 to 11 spines and 11 to 13 rays. The anal fin is scaled at the base and has 3 spines and 10 rays.

== Habitat ==
The blue hottentot lives on rocky reefs to a depth of 75 m. The fish feeds on reef invertebrates such as ascidians, polychaetes, hydroids, octocorals, sponges and gastropods.

== Life cycle ==
Demersal, spawns from September to March. They mature as females at about 25 cm and change to male at a larger size, can live to 12 years, and can reach 60 cm and 5 kg.

== Importance to humans ==
Commercial and recreational linefish, mostly caught from boats. Considered good eating, and sold fresh.

== Conservation status ==
IUCN least concern, assessed in December 2009. Not evaluated by CITES.
