= Rhoptropus taeniostictus =

Conservation status
- Least Concern (IUCN 3.1)

Scientific classification
- Kingdom: Animalia
- Phylum: Chordata
- Class: Reptilia
- Order: Squamata
- Suborder: Gekkota
- Family: Gekkonidae
- Genus: Rhoptropus
- Species: R. taeniostictus

Binomial name
- Rhoptropus taeniostictus Laurent, 1964

Species of lizard

Rhoptropus taeniostictus is a species of lizard in the family Gekkonidae. The species is endemic to Angola.
