= Colophon stokoei =

Conservation status
- Vulnerable (IUCN 2.3)

Scientific classification
- Kingdom: Animalia
- Phylum: Arthropoda
- Class: Insecta
- Order: Coleoptera
- Suborder: Polyphaga
- Infraorder: Scarabaeiformia
- Family: Lucanidae
- Genus: Colophon
- Species: C. stokoei

Binomial name
- Colophon stokoei Barnard, 1929

Species of beetle

Colophon stokoei is a species of beetle in family Lucanidae. It is endemic to South Africa.
