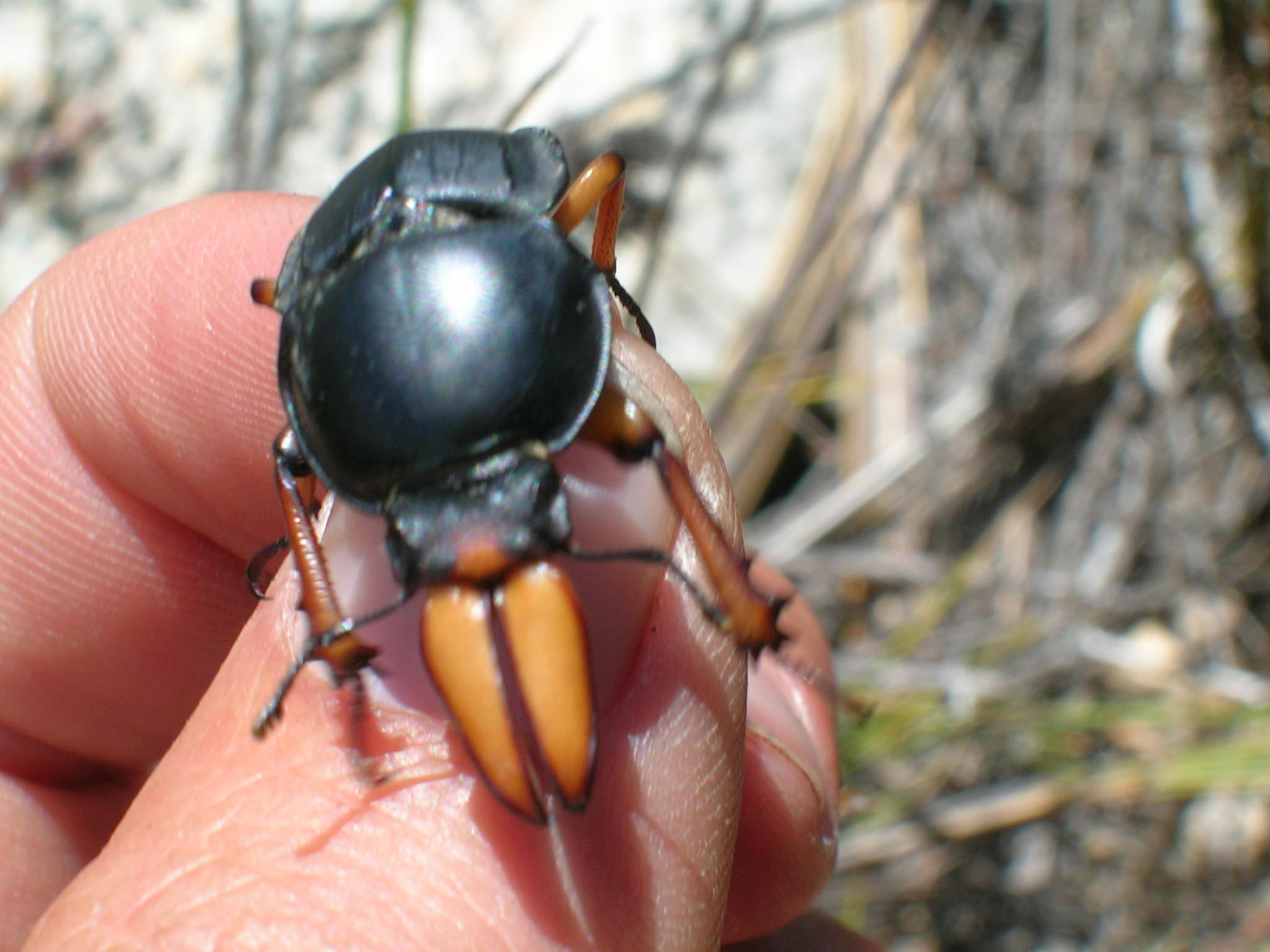
- Colophon primosi

Conservation status
- CITES Appendix III (CITES)

Scientific classification
- Domain: Eukaryota
- Kingdom: Animalia
- Phylum: Arthropoda
- Class: Insecta
- Order: Coleoptera
- Suborder: Polyphaga
- Infraorder: Scarabaeiformia
- Family: Lucanidae
- Subfamily: Lucaninae
- Genus: Colophon; Gray, 1832

Species
- Colophon barnardi Colophon berrisfordi Colophon cameroni Colophon cassoni Colophon eastmani Colophon endroedyi Colophon haughtoni Colophon izardi Colophon kawaii Colophon montisatris Colophon neli Colophon oweni Colophon primosi Colophon stokoei Colophon thunbergi Colophon westwoodi Colophon whitei

= Colophon (beetle) =

Genus of beetles

Colophon is a small genus of beetles in the stag beetle family Lucanidae.

These 17 species of beetles are flightless, and are endemic to South Africa, each restricted to its own mountain range or peak within a range (mostly between 1000 and 2000 m elevation). Dead specimens are highly prized by beetle collectors.

As a result of commercial pressure, Colophon beetles have been placed on CITES Appendix III. This means international import and export of Colophon species is regulated.

Limited reference specimens may only be collected for scientific purposes with the appropriate permit issued by the Department of Western Cape Nature Conservation.

All Colophon species are presently listed as endangered and Colophon primosi as critically endangered (these changes are not reflected in the 2006 IUCN Red List of Threatened Species, which was last updated in 1994).
