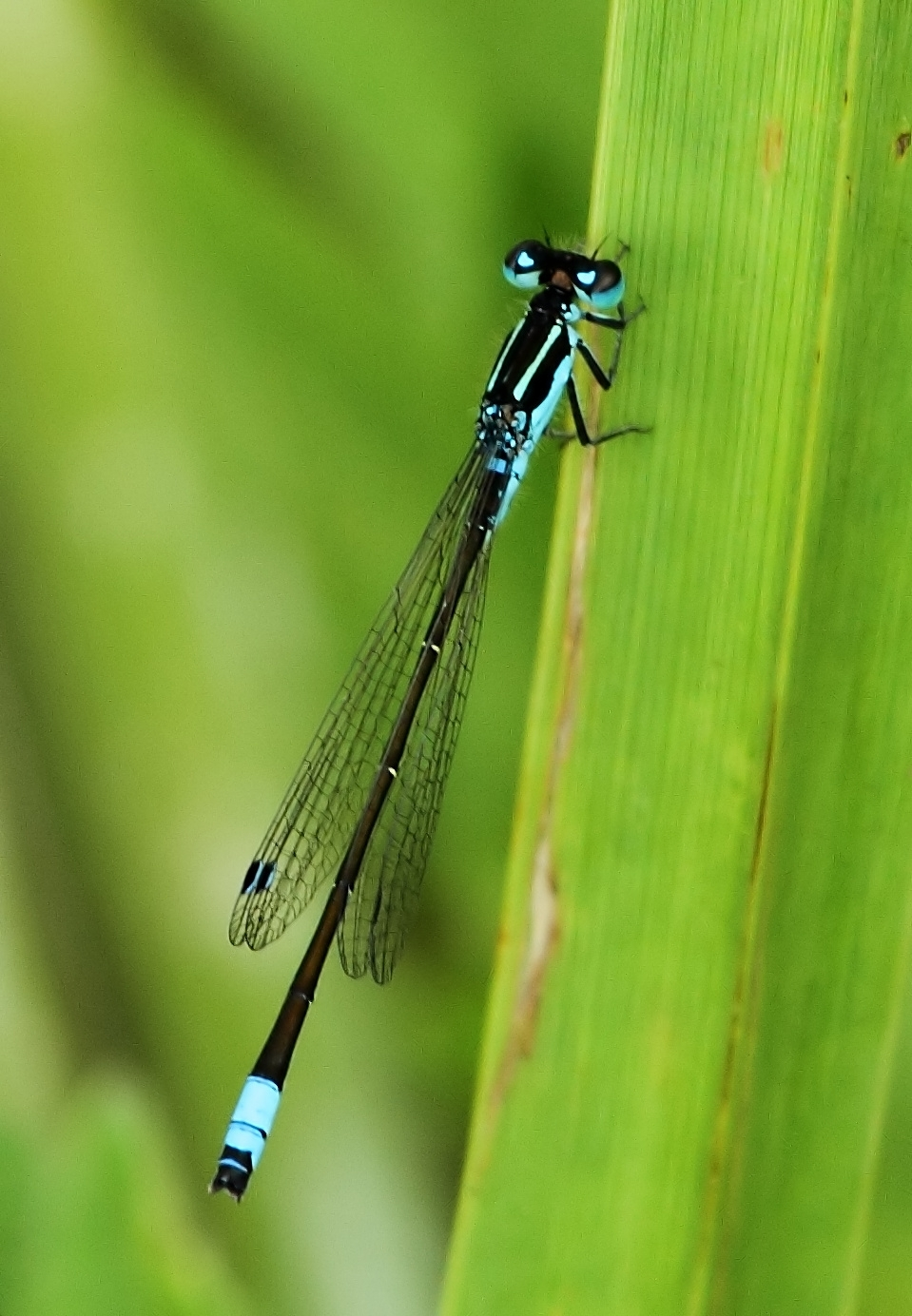
- Proischnura rotundipennis

Scientific classification
- Kingdom: Animalia
- Phylum: Arthropoda
- Class: Insecta
- Order: Odonata
- Suborder: Zygoptera
- Family: Coenagrionidae
- Genus: Proischnura
- Species: Proischnura

Binomial name
- Proischnura Kennedy, 1920

= Proischnura =

Genus of damselflies

Proischnura is a genus of damselfly in the family Coenagrionidae. It contains the following species:

- Proischnura polychromatica
- Proischnura rotundipennis
- Proischnura subfurcata
