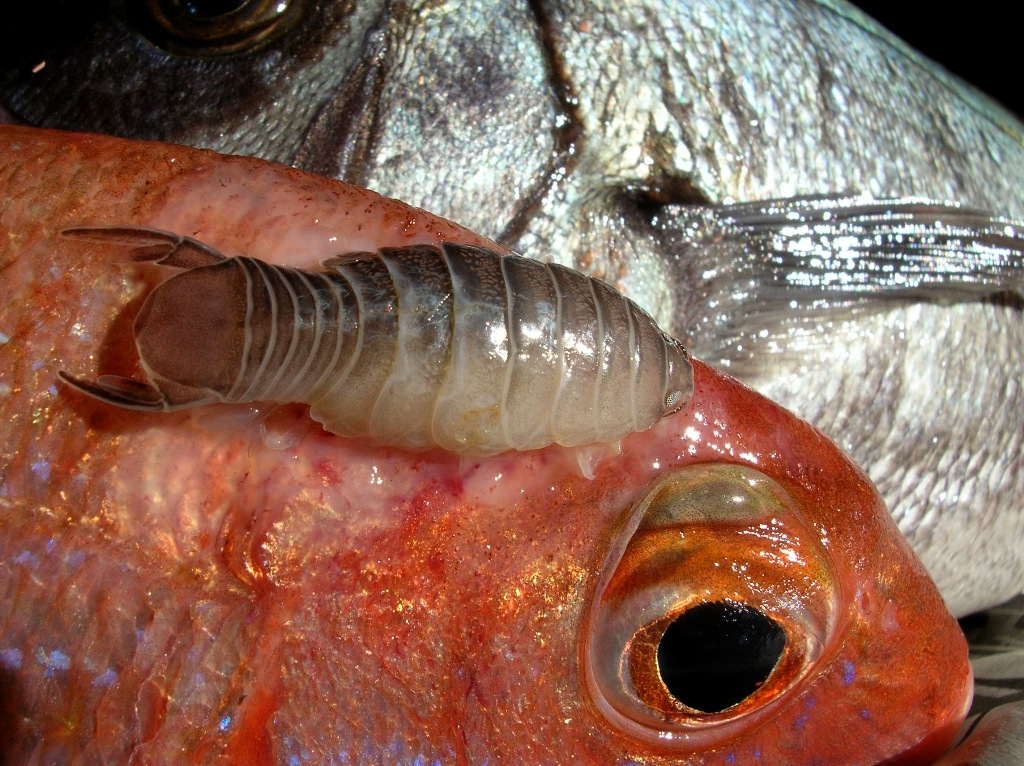
- Anilocra capensis attached to a panga

Scientific classification
- Kingdom: Animalia
- Phylum: Arthropoda
- Class: Malacostraca
- Order: Isopoda
- Family: Cymothoidae
- Genus: Anilocra
- Species: A. capensis

Binomial name
- Anilocra capensis Leach, 1818

= Anilocra capensis =

Species of crustacean

Anilocra capensis is a species of parasitic isopod in the family Cymothoidae. It is endemic to southern Africa. The species preferentially attaches itself to the hottentot seabream.

== Description ==
Anilocra capensis has a smooth, slate-grey carapace, with a five-segmented pleon. The head bears short antennae and is triangular, the telson is rounded. The legs end in powerful hooks that are used to grip the parasitized fish. The well-developed uropods often extend well beyond the body. The species can grow quite large and may reach a length of 60 mm.

== Distribution ==
The species occurs on the coast of southern Africa, from the west coast at Walvis Bay in Namibia to the east coast at East London in South Africa.

== Ecology ==
The members of the family Cymothoidae are commonly referred to as "fish lice" (although this term is also used for the family Argulidae, which are also crustaceans but not closely related). Like all Cymothoidae, A. capensis is an ectoparasite that attaches to a larger host and feeds off its body fluids. The species parasitizes fish, preferentially the hottentot Pachymetopon blochii, a mid-sized sea bream common in shallow-water kelp beds on the southern African coast. The isopod attaches itself to the fish's head above and behind the eye, rasps a hole into the skin, and consumes blood and other body juices. It was found that the size of A. capensis individuals and the hottentot it parasitizes were positively correlated, indicating that both host and parasite grow together. Both length and weight of parasitized fish were found to be slightly below those of unaffected fish, which suggests that host condition suffers to some extent from the presence of the isopod.
