= Rhoptropus biporosus =

Conservation status
- Least Concern (IUCN 3.1)

Scientific classification
- Kingdom: Animalia
- Phylum: Chordata
- Class: Reptilia
- Order: Squamata
- Suborder: Gekkota
- Family: Gekkonidae
- Genus: Rhoptropus
- Species: R. biporosus

Binomial name
- Rhoptropus biporosus FitzSimons, 1957

Species of lizard

Rhoptropus biporosus is a species of lizard in the family Gekkonidae. The species is found in Namibia and Angola.
