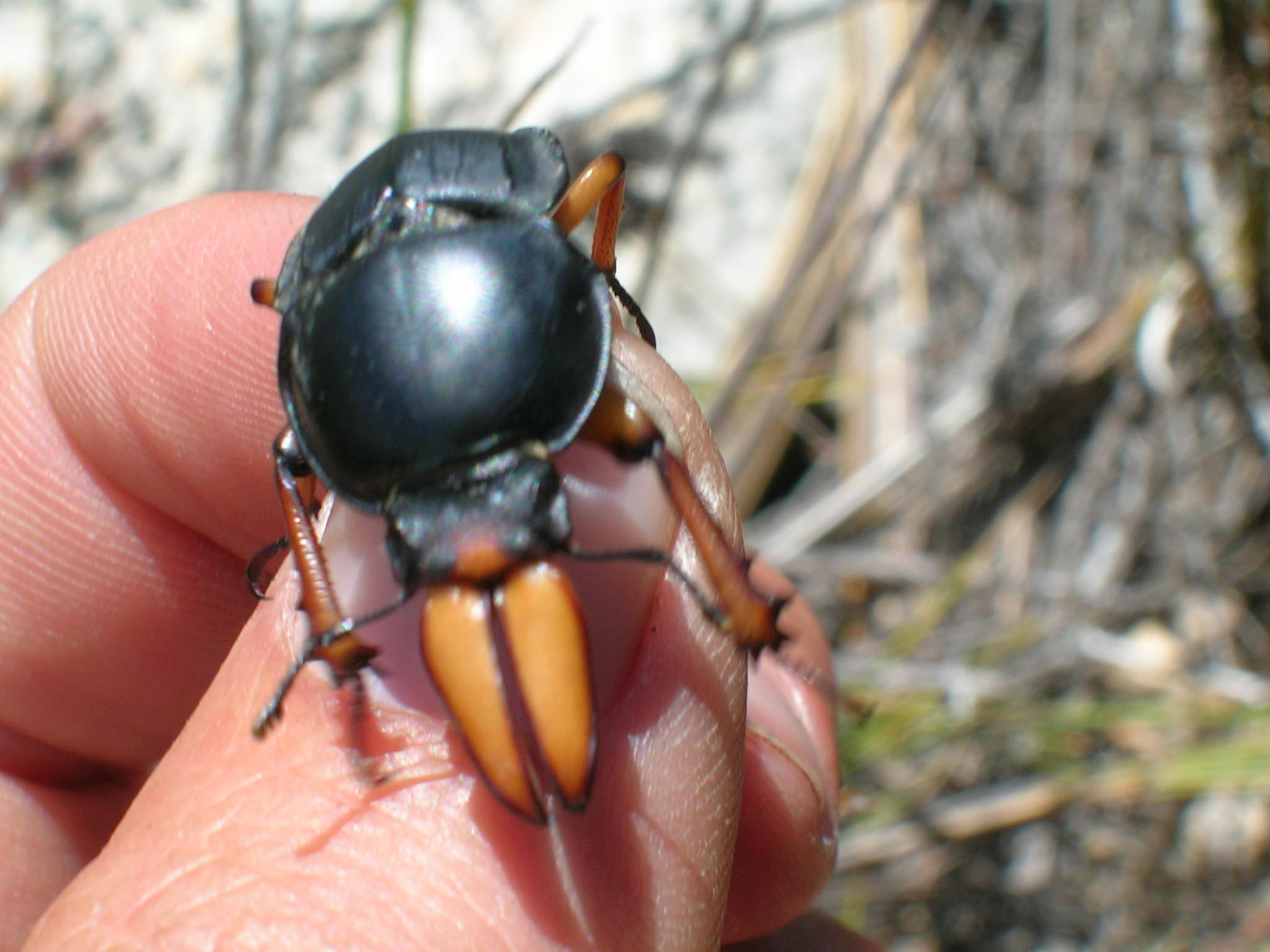

Conservation status
- Critically Endangered (IUCN 2.3)

Scientific classification
- Kingdom: Animalia
- Phylum: Arthropoda
- Class: Insecta
- Order: Coleoptera
- Suborder: Polyphaga
- Infraorder: Scarabaeiformia
- Family: Lucanidae
- Genus: Colophon
- Species: C. primosi

Binomial name
- Colophon primosi Barnard, 1929

= Colophon primosi =

Species of beetle

Colophon primosi is one of 17 described species of the stag beetle genus Colophon, endemic to South Africa.

Colophon beetles are also known as Barnard's stag beetles after Dr. Keppel Harcourt Barnard (1887–1964), who pioneered studies of this genus while working at the South African Museum. Barnard's mountaineering interest first brought him into contact with the genus, and many species of the beetles were named after his mountaineering friends.

Indiscriminate collecting and habitat destruction, especially from fires as the beetles are flightless, are so threatening to the genus, it has been placed under the protection of nature conservation laws in South Africa, with C. primosi being particularly endangered. Being flightless makes recolonisation of burnt areas more difficult for these beetles.

Though little is known of its lifecycle and habitat requirements, this has not deterred Japanese and European collectors of C. primosi. Consequently, the genus has been placed on CITES Appendix II, banning all trade, exchange, or sale of the insects. TRAFFIC has reported on insect trade fairs in Germany where tens of thousands of specimens have been offered for sale, and has called for threatened butterfly and beetle species to be placed under EU Wildlife Trade protection.
