= Rhoptropus benguellensis =

Conservation status
- Least Concern (IUCN 3.1)

Scientific classification
- Kingdom: Animalia
- Phylum: Chordata
- Class: Reptilia
- Order: Squamata
- Suborder: Gekkota
- Family: Gekkonidae
- Genus: Rhoptropus
- Species: R. benguellensis

Binomial name
- Rhoptropus benguellensis Mertens, 1938

Species of lizard

Rhoptropus benguellensis, the Benguela day gecko, is a species of lizard in the family Gekkonidae. The species is endemic to Angola.
