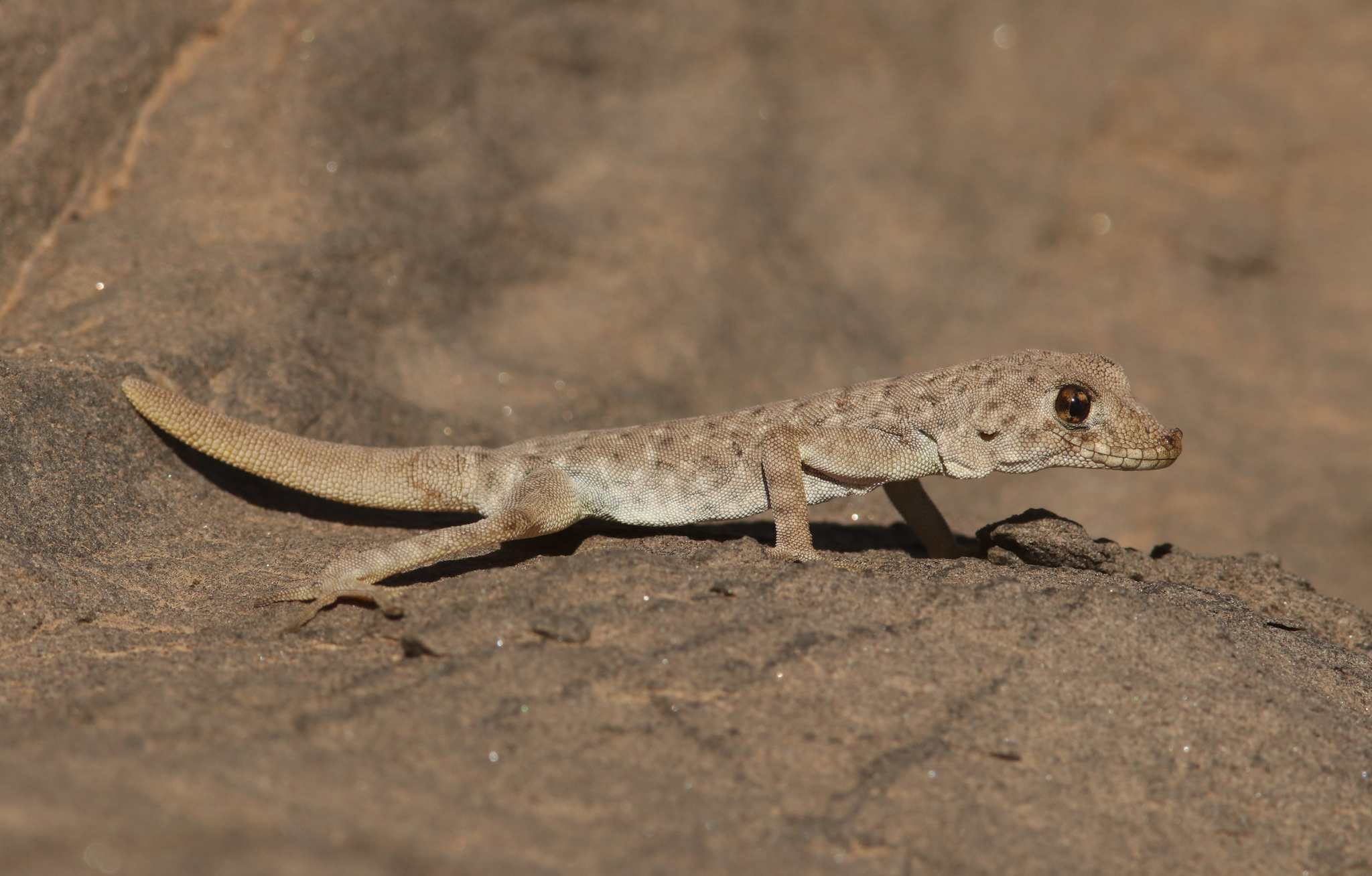

Conservation status
- Least Concern (IUCN 3.1)

Scientific classification
- Kingdom: Animalia
- Phylum: Chordata
- Class: Reptilia
- Order: Squamata
- Suborder: Gekkota
- Family: Gekkonidae
- Genus: Rhoptropus
- Species: R. afer

Binomial name
- Rhoptropus afer W. Peters, 1869

Synonyms
- Dactychylikion braconnieri Thominot, 1878; Rhoptropus braconnieri (Thominot, 1878)

= Namib day gecko =

Species of lizard

The Namib day gecko (Rhoptropus afer) is a species of lizard in the family Gekkonidae. The species is found in the deserts of Namibia and southern Angola. It is the type species of the genus Rhoptropus.

== Description ==
The Namib day gecko has a maximum snout-to-vent length (SVL) of about 50 mm (2.0 in). The dorsal surface is a well-camouflaged, dappled greyish-brown with small, rounded scales. The throat and the undersides of the tail and the limbs are bright yellow, the tail being "flashed" at other geckos as a signal. This gecko has long legs and long digits, apart from the abbreviated inner toe. The tips of the digits are flared, and the underside of the central digit has five or six scansors (specialist structures that help a gecko's feet to adhere to almost any surface).

== Distribution and habitat ==
R. afer is native to southwestern Africa, where its range includes southern Angola and northern Namibia. It is adapted to desert life and is found in a range of habitats both on the Atlantic coast and many kilometres inland.

== Ecology ==
The Namib day gecko is a diurnal species and feeds mostly on ants and beetles. On hot but breezy days, it may cool itself by climbing onto an elevated perch and raising itself high off the hot rock surface, orientating itself in such a way as to minimize its exposure to the sun. Geckos have highly sensitive colour night-vision capabilities. Geckos in the genus Rhoptropus are diurnal; their ancestors were nocturnal, but they have secondarily returned to daytime activity. Compared to the other members of its genus, the Namib day gecko is a runner rather than a climber. It uses its speed to escape from potential predators, being able to sprint at up to 2.5 m (8 ft) per second in bright light. However, in dim light, such as experienced on foggy days on this coast, its maximum speed is significantly lower.
