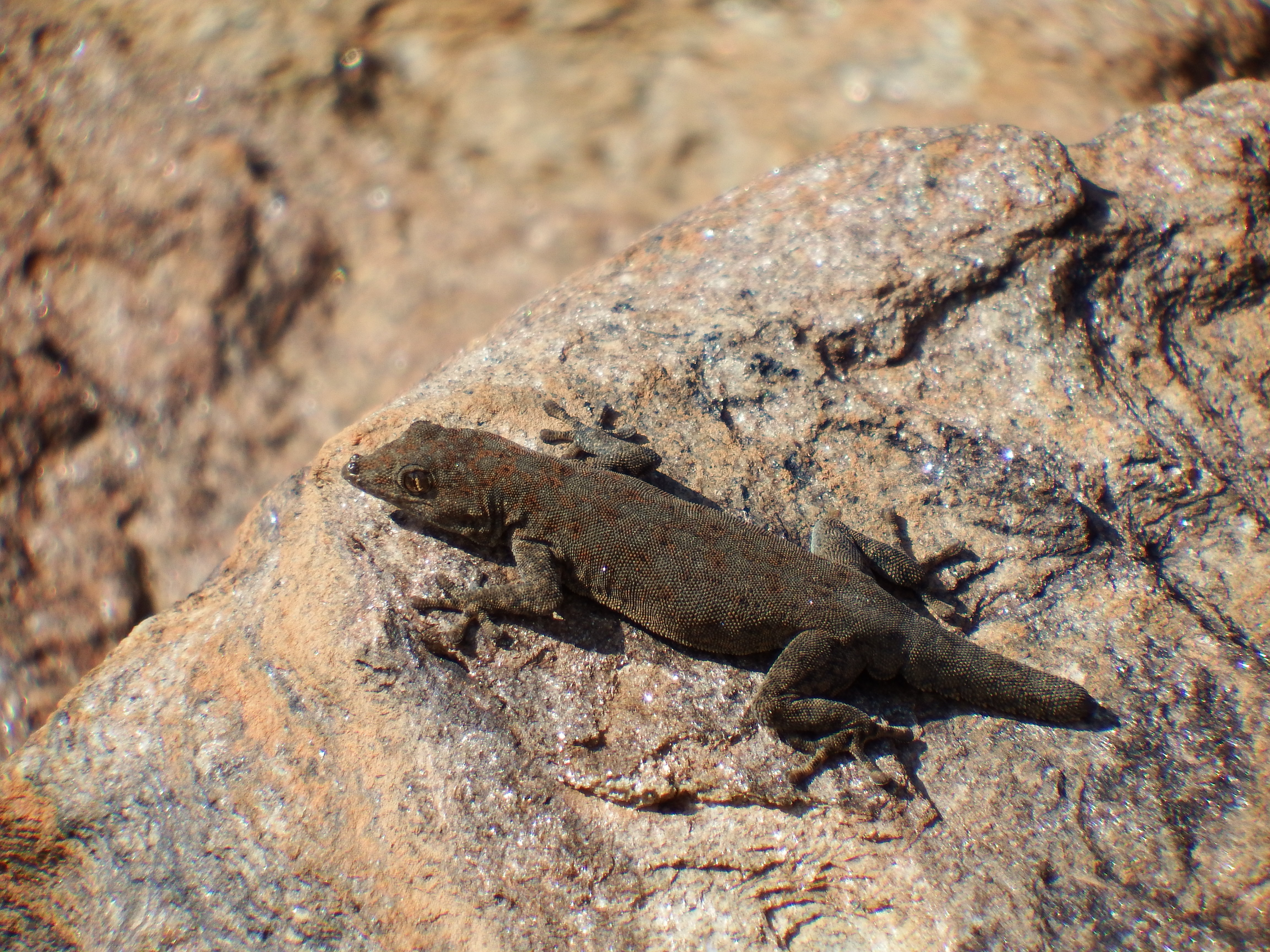

Conservation status
- Least Concern (IUCN 3.1)

Scientific classification
- Kingdom: Animalia
- Phylum: Chordata
- Class: Reptilia
- Order: Squamata
- Suborder: Gekkota
- Family: Gekkonidae
- Genus: Rhoptropus
- Species: R. boultoni

Binomial name
- Rhoptropus boultoni Schmidt, 1933

= Boulton's Namib day gecko =

Species of lizard

Boulton's Namib day gecko (Rhoptropus boultoni), also known commonly as Boulton's slender gecko, is a species of lizard in the family Gekkonidae. The species is native to southern Africa.

== Etymology ==
The specific name, boultoni, is in honor of American ornithologist Wolfrid Rudyerd Boulton.

== Geographic range ==
R. boultoni is found in Angola, Namibia, and South Africa.

== Habitat ==
The preferred natural habitat of R. boultoni is rocky areas of savanna, at altitudes of 50–1,300 m (160–4,270 ft).

== Description ==
Dorsally, R. boultoni is olive-brown to dark grey, mottled with maroon. Ventrally, it is lighter gray to bluish gray. Adults usually have a snout-to-vent length (SVL) of 5.5–7 cm (2.2–2.8 in).

== Reproduction ==
R. boultoni is oviparous. The adult female lays a clutch of two eggs.
