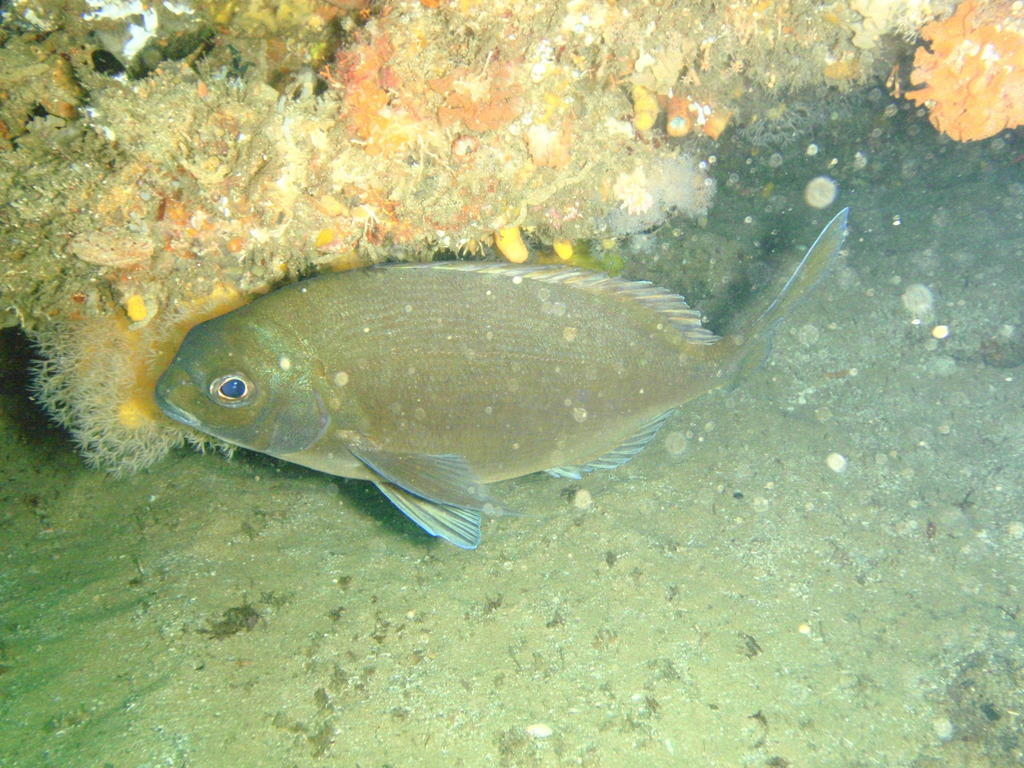

Conservation status
- Near Threatened (IUCN 3.1)

Scientific classification
- Kingdom: Animalia
- Phylum: Chordata
- Class: Actinopterygii
- Order: Acanthuriformes
- Family: Sparidae
- Genus: Pachymetopon
- Species: P. grande

Binomial name
- Pachymetopon grande Günther, 1859

Synonyms
- Pachymetopon guentheri Steindachner, 1869; Pachymetopon glaucum Norman, 1935

= Pachymetopon grande =

Species of fish

Pachymetopon grande, the bronze seabream or blue hottentot, is a species of marine ray-finned fishes belonging to the family Sparidae, which includes the seabreams and porgies. This species is found in the southwestern Indian Ocean. It is an important spoecies for recreational fisheries in South Africa and for subsistence fisheries too.

== Taxonomy ==
Pachymetopon grande was first formally described in 1859 by the German-born British herpetologist and ichthyologist Albert Günther with its type locality given as the Cape of Good Hope in South Africa. Günther classified this species in a new monospecific genus Pachymetopon and this species is the type species of that genus by momotypy. The genus Pachymetopon is placed in the family Sparidae within the order Spariformes by the 5th edition of Fishes of the World. Some authorities classify this genus in the subfamily Boopsinae, but the 5th edition of Fishes of the World does not recognise subfamilies within the Sparidae.

== Etymology ==
Pachymetopon grande has the specific name grande which means "large", an allusion that Günther did not explain but it may refer to the large prituberance between the eyes or the large body size of this species.

== Description ==
Pachymetopon grande has a rather rotund, deep body which has a standard length that is 2 to 2.3 times its depth. The dorsal profile of the head is smoothly convex with a slight protuberance in front of the eyes. The dorsal fin is supported by 11 spines and between 11 and 13 soft rays while the anal fin contains 3 spines and 10 or 11 soft rays. The overall colour of the body is bronze, paler on the belly and breast, with an iridescent blue head and blue pectoral fins. This species has a maximum total length of 65 cm (26 in), although 35 cm (14 in) is more typical.

== Distribution and habitat ==
Pachymetopon grande is endemic to Southern Africa where it is distributed from Southern Mozambique to False Bay in the Western Cape., it has also been recorded off southern Madagascar. It is found in shallow waters of less than about 25 m (82 ft) in rocky areas.

== Biology ==
Pachymetopon grande is an omnivore which grazes on algae and benthic invertebrates, juveniles feed on crustaceans to a greater extend than the adults. It is a rudimentary hermaphrodite but its gonochoristic, attaining sexual maturity when it is around 5.5 years old. Spawing occurs between January and June in the Eastern Cape and in winter in KwaZulu-Natal. It probably spawns in small aggregations and spawning takes place in the mornings and evenings. The adults are sedentary.

== Fisheries and conservation ==
Pachymetopon grande is heavily targeted by recreational fishers from the shore and by spear fishers but is not commercially targeted, although it is caught by subsistence fishers in the Eastern Cape. As a slow growing, late maturing, long lived, sedentary species this fish is vulnerable to overexploitation and there appears to have been a marked decline in numbers. There is a minimum size of 30 cm (12 in) and a bag limit of 2 fish per day for anglers. This species responds well to protection and numbers increase in Marine protected areas. The IUCN classify this fish as a Near-threatened species.
