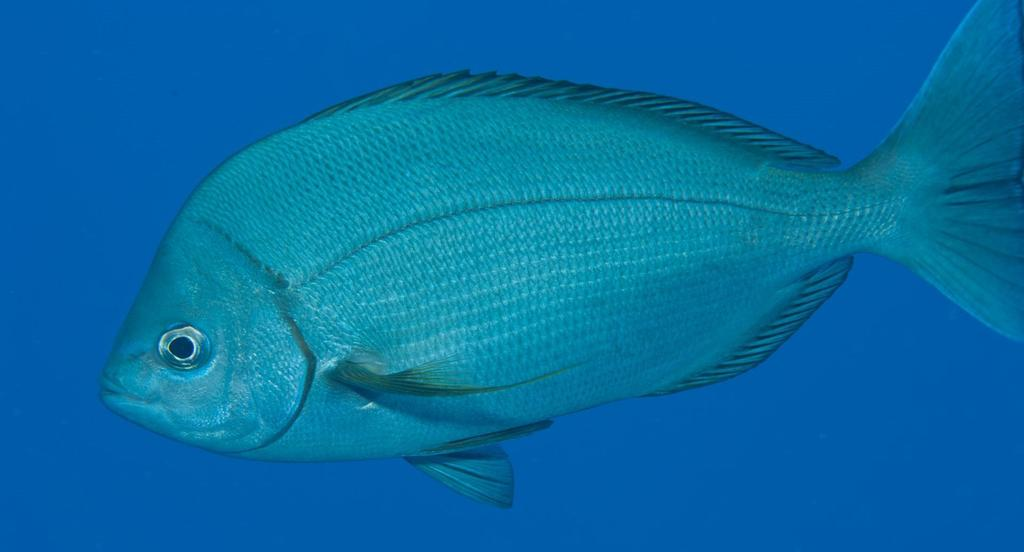

Conservation status
- Least Concern (IUCN 3.1)

Scientific classification
- Kingdom: Animalia
- Phylum: Chordata
- Class: Actinopterygii
- Division: Teleostei
- Order: Acanthuriformes
- Family: Sparidae
- Genus: Polyamblyodon
- Species: P. gibbosum

Binomial name
- Polyamblyodon gibbosum (Pellegrin, 1914)

Synonyms
- Pachymetopon gibbosus Pellegrin, 1914; Polyamblyodon cristiceps J. L. B. Smith, 1940

= Polyamblyodon gibbosum =

"Christie" seabream, a fish endemic to the Southern African east coast

Polyamblyodon gibbosum, the knife-back seabream or cristie, is a species of marine ray-finned fish belonging to the family Sparidae, which includes the seabreams and porgies. This species is endemic to the southwestern Indian Ocean.

== Taxonomy and etymology ==
Polyamblyodon gibbosum was first formally described as Pachymetopon gibbosus in 1914 by the French ichthyologist Jacques Pellegrin with its type locality given as Fort-Dauphin in Madagascar. The genus Polyamblyodon is placed in the family Sparidae within the order Spariformes by the 5th edition of Fishes of the World. Some authorities classify this genus in the subfamily Pagellinae, but the 5th edition of Fishes of the World does not recognise subfamilies within the Sparidae.

The generic name Polyamblyodon is Greek for "many blunt tooth," while the specific name gibbosum is Latin for "humpbacked", an allusion to the hump in front of the dorsal fin, largest in adults.

== Description ==
Polyamblyodon gibbosum has a dorsal fin which is supported by 11 spines and 13 soft rays while there are 3 spines and 10 or 11 soft rays. It has a compressed, rather deep body which becomes more ovoid with age. The depth of the body fits into its standard length between 2 and 2.3 times. It has a steep dorsal profile to its head, growing steeper with age. It is moderately concave between the upper lip and the acute nape, and then it is convex to the origin of the dorsal fin origin. The upper body is grey-blue to dusky with the lateral line scales being darker and very noticeable, the body is lighter in colour below the lateral line. The rear margin of the gill cover is darl with the fins being lighter in colour except that the tips of the pelvic fins, pectoral fins and caudal fin lobes are rather dusky. The maximum published total length of this species is 60 cm (24 in), although 35 cm (14 in) is more typical.

== Distribution and habitat ==
Polyamblyodon gibbosum is endemic to the southwestern Indian Ocean where it is found around southern Madagascar and from Beira, Mozambique in Mozambique to Port Edward in KwaZulu-Natal. This species is found at depths between 2 and 25 m (6 ft 7 in and 82 ft 0 in) over offshore reefs.

== Biology ==
Polyamblyodon gibbosum is found in shoals in the middle of the water column where it feeds on zooplankton. They are often seen gathering near boats close to the surface.
