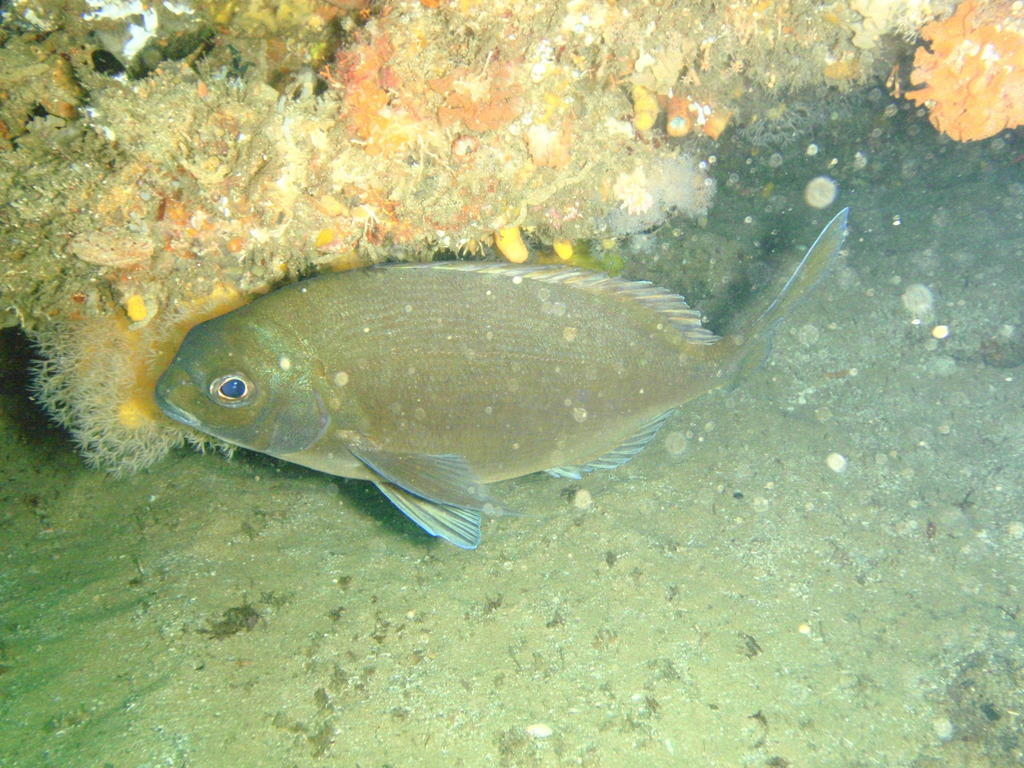
- Bronze seabream (Pachymetopon grande)

Scientific classification
- Kingdom: Animalia
- Phylum: Chordata
- Class: Actinopterygii
- Division: Teleostei
- Order: Acanthuriformes
- Family: Sparidae
- Genus: Pachymetopon; Günther, 1859

Type species
- Pachymetopon grande Günther, 1859

Synonyms
- Simocantharus Fowler, 1933

= Pachymetopon =

Genus of fishes

Pachymetopon is a genus of marine ray-finned fishes belonging to the family Sparidae, which includes the seabreams and porgies. The species in this genus are endemic to Southern Africa.

== Taxonomy ==
Pachymetopon was first proposed as a monospecific genus in 1859 by the German-born British herpetologist and ichthyologist Albert Günther when he described The bronze seabream (P. grande), giving its type locality as the Cape of Good Hope in South Africa. This taxon is placed in the family Sparidae within the order Spariformes by the 5th edition of Fishes of the World. Some authorities classify this genus in the subfamily Boopsinae, but the 5th edition of Fishes of the World does not recognise subfamilies within the Sparidae.

== Etymology ==
Pachymetopon combines pachy, meaning "thick", with metopon, which means "brow" or "forehead", a reference to the protuberance between the eyes of the type species, P. grande.

== Species ==
Pachymetopon contains the following species:

- Pachymetopon aeneum (Gilchrist & W. W. Thompson, 1908) (Blue hottentot)
- Pachymetopon blochii (Valenciennes, 1830) (Hottentot seabream)
- Pachymetopon grande Günther, 1859 (Bronze Seabream)

== Characteristics ==
Pachymetopon seabreams are characterised by having plump bodies with small mouths which have pouting lips and are oblique when shut. There are 4 or 5 rows of incisor-like teetth in both jaws and no molar-like teeth. There are no scales between the eyes. The base of the fin membrane between the soft rays on the dorsal and anal fins have dense scaling but none of the fins have a scaly sheath at their base. The largest species is the bronze seabream (P. grande) which has a maximum published total length of 65 cm (26 in), while the smallest is the Hottentot seabream (P blochii) with a maximum published total length of 46 cm (18 in).

== Distribution and habitat ==
Pachymetopon seabreams are endemic to the waters off the coasts of South Africa in the southeastern Atlantic Ocean and the southwestern Indian Ocean. The most widespread species is the Hottentot seabream which ranges from Angola to Port Alfred in the Eastern Cape. The other two species are found in the southwestern Indian Ocean from Mozambique to Cape Point with the bronze seabream apparently being recorded off southern Madagascar. These fishes are found in rocky regions in shallow water less than 55 m (180 ft) in depth.
