= Keppel Harcourt Barnard =

South African zoologist and museum director (1887–1964)

Thomas Pearson Stokoe's photo (c. 1913) of Keppel Barnard on 'Staircase' above Camps Bay

Keppel Harcourt Barnard (31 March 1887 – 22 September 1964) was a South African zoologist and museum director. He was the only son of Harcourt George Barnard, a solicitor from Lambeth, and Anne Elizabeth Porter of Royston.

== Life and career ==
Barnard was born in London. His first education was at a private school in Camberley from where he went to the Realgymnasium in Mannheim to improve his German. From 1905 to 1908 this unusually gifted and versatile scholar attended Christ's College, Cambridge, taking the Natural Sciences Tripos in Botany, Geology and Zoology. He also took the newly introduced courses in Anthropology, Ethnology and Geography. For the following three years he studied law at the Middle Temple, becoming a barrister in 1911. After a short spell as naturalist with the Marine Biological Laboratory in Plymouth, he joined the staff of the South African Museum in Cape Town in 1911 as a marine biology assistant. He became assistant director in 1921 and director from 1946 until his 1956 retirement when he was free to work on the molluscs.

His D.Sc. was from the University of Cape Town with a dissertation on the "Distribution of Crustacea in South African Waters", and he eventually became a world authority on crustaceans. His other favoured field was the taxonomy and classification of South African fishes, a discipline in which he did important pioneering work. Stellenbosch University awarded him an honorary doctorate in 1956.

Barnard was a keen mountaineer and served as secretary of the Mountain Club of South Africa from 1918 to 1945, and it was by way of the mountains that he met the amateur botanist Thomas Pearson Stokoe who was to become a close friend and climbing companion. Barnard's mountaineering interest first brought him into contact with the genus Colophon, and many species of the beetle, such as Colophon primosi, were named after his mountaineering friends. In 1915 he married Alice Watkins, and they raised a family of two children, a son and a daughter. Barnard died, aged 73, in Cape Town.

Barnard's studies of South African Crustacea, Mollusca, fishes and insects added significantly to our knowledge of these groups. He was undoubtedly one of South Africa's greatest zoologists but a modest and retiring man despite his prodigious scientific achievements. Among the honours he received were: Fellowship of the Linnean Society of London, Fellowship of the Royal Society of South Africa, the Gold Badge of the Mountain Club of South Africa, the King George V Silver Jubilee Medal, the Senior Captain Scott Medal, and the medal and grant of the South African Association for the Advancement of Science. In 1956 the University of Stellenbosch conferred on him the degree of D.Sc. honoris causa."

— Grindley, 1981,

== Legacy ==
Barnard is commemorated in the scientific names of two species of geckos, Pachydactylus barnardi and Rhoptropus barnardi.

And a fish Enteromius barnardi. R. A. Jubb, 1965
