= Scelidocteus baccatus =

Scientific classification
- Domain: Eukaryota
- Kingdom: Animalia
- Phylum: Arthropoda
- Subphylum: Chelicerata
- Class: Arachnida
- Order: Araneae
- Infraorder: Araneomorphae
- Family: Palpimanidae
- Genus: Scelidocteus
- Species: S. baccatus

Binomial name
- Scelidocteus baccatus Simon, 1907

Species of spider

Scelidocteus baccatus is a spider species of the family Palpimanidae that is endemic on São Tomé Island. It was first described in 1907 by Eugène Simon.

Its female holotype measures 5 mm.
