= IUCN Red List critically endangered species (Animalia) =

As of 19 August 2018, the IUCN Red List of Threatened Species has identified 3,005 critically endangered species, subspecies, stocks and subpopulations in the Animalia kingdom.

== Annelida ==
=== Clitellata ===
==== Megadrilaceae ====
===== Lumbricidae =====
- Eisenia anzac

===== Megascolecidae =====
- Aporodrilus mortenseni
- Perionychella ngakawau

==== Opisthopora ====
===== Acanthodrilidae =====
- Maoridrilus felix

===== Octochaetidae =====
- Octochaetus levis
- Octochaetus microchaetus

=== Polychaeta ===
==== Nerillida ====
===== Nerillidae =====
- Mesonerilla prospera

== Arthropoda ==
=== Arachnida ===
==== Araneae ====
===== Barychelidae =====
- Idioctis intertidalis

===== Corinnidae =====
- Paccius quadridentatus

===== Ctenidae =====
- Apolania (Apolania segmentata)

===== Ctenizidae =====
- Conothele truncicola

===== Gnaphosidae =====
- Microdrassus (Microdrassus inaudax)
- Prodida stella

===== Linyphiidae =====
- Nothophantes (Nothophantes horridus)

===== Liphistiidae =====
- Liphistius kanthan

===== Lycosidae =====
- Hogna ingens

===== Miturgidae =====
(Includes former Zoridae.)

- Voraptus tenellus

===== Ochyroceratidae =====
- Euso muehlenbergi

===== Oonopidae =====
- Farqua (Farqua quadrimaculata)
- Gamasomorpha austera
- Ischnothyrella jivani
- Lionneta gerlachi
- Opopaea probosciella
- Opopaea suspecta
- Orchestina maureen

===== Palpimanidae =====
- Hybosida dauban
- Hybosida lucida
- Steriphopus lacertosus

===== Pholcidae =====
- Spermophorides lascars

===== Salticidae =====
- Hasarius mahensis
- Paraheliophanus napoleon

===== Segestriidae =====
- Ariadna ustulata

===== Symphytognathidae =====
- Anapistula ataecina
- Patu silho

===== Telemidae =====
- Seychellia lodoiceae

===== Theraphosidae =====
- Nesiergus gardineri
- Nesiergus halophilus
- Poecilotheria hanumavilasumica
- Poecilotheria metallica

===== Theridiidae =====
- Moneta coercervea
- Sesato (Sesato setosa)

===== Theridiosomatidae =====
- Andasta siltte
- Zoma zoma

==== Holothyrida ====
===== Holothyridae =====
- Dicrogonatus niger
- Michaelothyrus seychellensis

==== Opiliones ====
===== Biantidae =====
- Biantes parvulus

===== Podoctidae =====
- Holozoster ovalis
- Ibalonius lomani
- Sitalcicus incertus

===== Samoidae =====
- Benoitinus elegans
- Mitraceras crassipalpum

==== Pseudoscorpiones ====
===== Geogarypidae =====
- Afrogarypus seychellesensis

==== Schizomida ====
===== Hubbardiidae =====
- Mahezomus apicoporus

==== Scorpiones ====
===== Buthidae =====
- Lychas braueri

=== Branchiopoda ===
==== Anostraca ====
===== Branchinectidae =====
- Branchinecta belki
- Branchinecta mexicana

===== Streptocephalidae =====
- Streptocephalus gracilis
- Streptocephalus moorei

===== Thamnocephalidae =====
- Branchinella lithaca

=== Chilopoda ===
==== Geophilomorpha ====
===== Ballophilidae =====
- Ityphilus melanostigmus

===== Mecistocephalidae =====
- Mecistocephalus cyclops
- Mecistocephalus sechellarum

=== Diplopoda ===
==== Polydesmida ====
===== Paradoxosomatidae =====
- Diglossosternoides curiosus

==== Polyzoniida ====
===== Siphonotidae =====
- Rhinotus albifrons

==== Sphaerotheriida ====
===== Arthrosphaeridae =====
- Microsphaerotherium anjozorobe
- Sphaeromimus andrahomana
- Sphaeromimus lavasoa
- Sphaeromimus saintelucei
- Sphaeromimus splendidus
- Sphaeromimus titanus
- Zoosphaerium alluaudi
- Zoosphaerium darthvaderi
- Zoosphaerium heleios
- Zoosphaerium piligerum
- Zoosphaerium priapus
- Zoosphaerium tampolo
- Zoosphaerium xerophilum

==== Spirobolida ====
===== Pachybolidae =====
- Alluviobolus laticlavius
- Aphistogoniulus corallipes
- Colossobolus litoralis
- Colossobolus minor
- Colossobolus pseudoaculeatus
- Eucarlia mauriesi
- Granitobolus endemicus
- Ostinobolus subterraneus
- Riotintobolus mandenensis
- Riotintobolus minutus
- Spiromimus albipes
- Spiromimus litoralis
- Spiromimus scapularis

===== Spirobolellidae =====
- Hylekobolus andasibensis
- Hylekobolus latifrons
- Spirobolellus simplex

==== Spirostreptida ====
===== Spirostreptidae =====
- Doratogonus major
- Sechelleptus unilineatus

==== Stemmiulida ====
===== Stemmiulidae =====
- Eostemmiulus caecus

=== Entognatha ===
==== Collembola ====
===== Hypogastruridae =====
- Ceratophysella sp. nov. 'HC'

===== Tullbergiidae =====
- Delamarephorura tami

=== Insecta ===
==== Blattodea ====
===== Blattellidae =====
- Balta crassivenosa
- Delosia ornata
- Hololeptoblatta pandanicola
- Sliferia similis
- Theganopteryx grisea
- Theganopteryx liturata
- Theganopteryx scotti

===== Polyphagidae =====
- Holocompsa pusilla

==== Coleoptera ====
===== Anthribidae =====
- Homoeodera asteris
- Homoeodera edithia
- Homoeodera elateroides
- Homoeodera longefasciata
- Homoeodera major
- Homoeodera nodulipennis
- Homoeodera rotundipennis
- Homoeodera scolytoides
- Valenfriesia janischi
- Valenfriesia rotundata

===== Carabidae =====
- Bembidion derelictus
- Calathus carvalhoi
- Calathus lundbladi
- Delta green ground beetle (Elaphrus viridis)
- Olisthopus inclavatus
- Pseudanchomenus aptinoides
- Thalassophilus azoricus
- Trechus jorgensis
- Trechus montanheirorum
- Trechus oromii
- Trechus pereirai
- Trechus torretassoi

===== Cerambycidae =====
- Schurmannia sicula
- Trichoferus bergeri

===== Chrysomelidae =====
- Mniophilosoma obscurum

===== Cicindelidae =====
- Cicindela albissima

===== Curculionidae =====
- Calacalles azoricus
- Caulotrupis parvus
- Donus multifidus
- Hadramphus tuberculatus

===== Dytiscidae =====
- Hydrotarsus compunctus
- Meladema imbricata

===== Elateridae =====
- Athous pomboi

===== Geotrupidae =====
- Thorectes coloni

===== Laemophloeidae =====
- Cryptolestes azoricus

===== Leiodidae =====
- Catops velhocabrali

===== Lucanidae =====
- Colophon berrisfordi
- Colophon cassoni
- Colophon montisatris
- Colophon primosi

===== Ptinidae =====
- Sphaericus velhocabrali

===== Rhadalidae =====
- Gietella faialensis

===== Scarabaeidae =====
- Cromwell chafer beetle (Prodontria lewisi)
- Propomacrus cypriacus

===== Silphidae =====
- Nicrophorus americanus

===== Staphylinidae =====
- Aleochara freyi
- Atheta caprariensis
- Atheta floresensis
- Geostiba melanocephala
- Medon varamontis
- Phytosus schatzmayri

===== Tenebrionidae =====
- Mycetochara melandryina
- Nesotes azoricus

===== Zopheridae =====
- Tarphius acuminatus
- Tarphius depressus
- Tarphius floresensis
- Tarphius gabrielae
- Tarphius pomboi
- Tarphius relictus
- Tarphius rufonodulosus
- Tarphius serranoi
- Tarphius wollastoni

==== Dermaptera ====
===== Carcinophoridae =====
- Antisolabis seychellensis

===== Labiidae =====
- Chaetolabia fryeri
- Chaetospania gardineri

==== Grylloblattodea ====
===== Grylloblattidae =====
- Galloisiana kosuensis

==== Hemiptera ====
===== Cixiidae =====
- Cixius cavazoricus

===== Pseudococcidae =====
- Pseudococcus markharveyi

===== Psyllidae =====
- Acizzia veski

===== Triozidae =====
- Trioza barrettae

==== Hymenoptera ====
===== Andrenidae =====
- Andrena labiatula

===== Apidae =====
- Ammobates dusmeti
- Bombus affinis
- Franklin's bumblebee (Bombus franklini)
- Bombus rubriventris
- Bombus suckleyi
- Bombus variabilis
- Nomada siciliensis

===== Formicidae =====
- Adetomyrma venatrix
- Sri Lankan relict ant (Aneuretus simoni)
- Nothomyrmecia macrops

===== Megachilidae =====
- Megachile cypricola

==== Isoptera ====
===== Kalotermitidae =====
- Glyptotermes scotti
- Procryptotermes fryeri

==== Lepidoptera ====
===== Geometridae =====
- Eupithecia ogilviata

===== Lycaenidae =====
- Chrysoritis cotrelli
- Lepidochrysops lotana
- Polyommatus bollandi
- Pseudophilotes sinaicus

===== Noctuidae =====
- Hadena azorica
- Phlogophora kruegeri

===== Nymphalidae =====
- Heliconius nattereri
- David's tiger (Parantica davidi)
- Pseudochazara cingovskii

===== Papilionidae =====
- Pachliopta jophon (also Atrophaneura jophon)

===== Pieridae =====
- Madeiran large white (Pieris wollastoni)

===== Pterophoridae =====
- Agdistis marionae

===== Pyralidae =====
- Homoeosoma miguelensis
- Homoeosoma picoensis

===== Sphingidae =====
- Prairie sphinx moth (Euproserpinus wiesti)

===== Stathmopodidae =====
- Neomariania incertella

===== Tineidae =====
- Tinea poecilella

==== Mantodea ====
===== Mantidae =====
- Spined dwarf mantis (Ameles fasciipennis)

==== Odonata ====
===== Argiolestidae =====
- Neurolestes nigeriensis

===== Calopterygidae =====
- Echo maxima

===== Chlorocyphidae =====
- Chlorocypha aurora
- Chlorocypha jejuna
- Platycypha amboniensis
- Rhinocypha ogasawarensis

===== Chlorogomphidae =====
- Chlorogomphus brunneus keramensis

===== Coenagrionidae =====
- Africallagma cuneistigma
- Enallagma maldivensis
- Fluminagrion taxaense
- Ischnura ezoin
- Mecistogaster pronoti
- Megalagrion leptodemas
- Megalagrion molokaiense
- Megalagrion nesiotes
- Metaleptobasis gibbosa
- Minagrion ribeiroi
- Pseudagrion mascagnii
- Pyrrhosoma elisabethae

===== Cordulegastridae =====
- Cordulegaster helladica kastalia

===== Euphaeidae =====
- Cryptophaea saukra

===== Gomphidae =====
- Anisogomphus solitaris
- Heliogomphus ceylonicus
- Heliogomphus lyratus
- Heliogomphus nietneri
- Onychogomphus boudoti

===== Heteragrionidae =====
- Heteragrion peregrinum

===== Lestidae =====
- Indolestes boninensis
- Sinhalestes orientalis

===== Libellulidae =====
- Boninthemis insularis
- Elga newtonsantosi
- Erythrodiplax acantha
- Erythrodiplax nivea
- Libellula angelina
- Micrathyria kleerekoperi
- Micromacromia miraculosa
- Orthetrum rubens
- Sympetrum evanescens
- Zygonychidium gracile

===== Macromiidae =====
- Macromia flinti

===== Megapodagrionidae =====
- Amanipodagrion gilliesi

===== Not Assigned =====
- Austrocordulia leonardi

===== Pentaphlebiidae =====
- Pentaphlebia gamblesi

===== Perilestidae =====
- Perissolestes remus

===== Platycnemididae =====
- Allocnemis maccleeryi
- Elattoneura lapidaria
- Elattoneura leucostigma (synonym Disparoneura ramajana)
- Elattoneura pluotae
- Proplatycnemis pembipes
- Risiocnemis seidenschwarzi

===== Platystictidae =====
- Drepanosticta adami
- Drepanosticta austeni
- Drepanosticta hilaris
- Drepanosticta montana
- Drepanosticta submontana
- Palaemnema croceicauda
- Palaemnema edmondi
- Protosticta gracilis
- Protosticta plicata
- Protosticta rozendalorum

==== Orthoptera ====
===== Acrididae =====
- Allaga ambigua
- Anischnansis burtti
- Burttia sylvatica
- Chorthippus acroleucus
- Chorthippus antecessor
- Chorthippus bozdaghi
- Chorthippus ilkazi
- Chorthippus lacustris
- Chrysochraon beybienkoi
- Cyphocerastis uluguruensis
- Eupropacris abbreviata
- Gastrimargus immaculatus
- Italopodisma baccettii
- Italopodisma ebneri
- Italopodisma lagrecai
- Italopodisma lucianae
- Myrmeleotettix ethicus
- Oropodisma lagrecai
- Oropodisma willemsei
- Peripodisma ceraunii
- Physocrobylus tessa
- Podisma emiliae
- Podisma magdalenae
- Podisma silvestrii
- Podismopsis transsylvanica
- Schayera baiulus
- Stenobothrus croaticus
- Zubovskya banatica

===== Dericorythidae =====
- Dericorys minutus

===== Euschmidtiidae =====
- Chromomastax movogovodia
- Euschmidtia bidens
- Euschmidtia burtti
- Euschmidtia dirshi
- Euschmidtia phippsi
- Euschmidtia uvarovi
- Euschmidtia viridifasciata

===== Gryllidae =====
- Gryllapterus tomentosus
- Phalangacris alluaudi
- Seychellesia nitidula

===== Lentulidae =====
- Chromousambilla burtti

===== Mogoplistidae =====
- Arachnocephalus medvedevi

===== Pamphagidae =====
- Acrostira bellamyi
- Acrostira euphorbiae
- Prionotropis rhodanica

===== Pyrgacrididae =====
- Pyrgacris descampsi
- Pyrgacris relictus

===== Pyrgomorphidae =====
- Pyrgomorphula serbica

===== Rhaphidophoridae =====
- Troglophilus marinae

===== Tetrigidae =====
- Agkistropleuron simplex
- Andriana hancocki
- Coptottigia cristata
- Cryptotettix insularis
- Hybotettix camelus
- Microthymochares pullus
- Procytettix fusiformis
- Procytettix hova
- Tettigidea empedonepia
- Thymochares delphini

===== Tettigoniidae =====
- Acilacris furcatus
- Acilacris kristinae
- Aglaothorax longipennis
- Anonconotus apenninigenus
- Aroegas nigroornatus
- Arytropteris pondo
- Austrodontura castletoni
- Bradyporus montandoni
- Cedarbergeniana imperfecta
- Coracinotus squamiferus
- Ctenodecticus major
- Decorana drepanensis
- Ephippiger camillae
- Eupholidoptera feri
- Evergoderes cabrerai
- Griffiniana duplessisae
- Hemisaga elongata
- Idiostatus middlekaufi
- Isophya beybienkoi
- Isophya boldyrevi
- Isophya doneciana
- Isophya gulae
- Isophya harzi
- Ixalodectes flectocercus
- Leptophyes calabra
- Nanodectes bulbicercus
- Pachysaga strobila
- Paracilacris periclitatus
- Paradecolya briseferi
- Parnassiana gionica
- Parnassiana menalon
- Parnassiana nigromarginata
- Parnassiana panaetolikon
- Parnassiana parnassica
- Peringueyella zulu
- Platycleis iberica
- Platycleis kibris
- Poecilimon pechevi
- Pseudosaga maraisi
- Psorodonotus ebneri
- Rhacocleis trilobata
- Rodriguesiophisis spinifera
- Sardoplatycleis galvagnii
- Tettigonia longispina
- Thoracistus arboreus
- Thoracistus peringueyi
- Transkeidectes multidentis
- Uromenus dyrrhachiacus
- Uromenus riggioi

===== Thericleidae =====
- Acanthothericles bicoloripes

===== Trigonidiidae =====
- Metioche payendeei
- Metioche superbus

==== Phasmatodea ====
===== Diapheromeridae =====
- Cornicandovia australica

===== Lonchodidae =====
- Carausius scotti

===== Phasmatidae =====
- Davidrentzia valida
- Dryococelus australis

==== Phthiraptera ====
===== Haematopinidae =====
- Haematopinus oliveri

==== Plecoptera ====
===== Gripopterygidae =====
- Riekoperla darlingtoni

=== Malacostraca ===
==== Amphipoda ====
===== Bogidiellidae =====
- Bogidiella bermudiensis

===== Gammaridae =====
- Gammarus desperatus

===== Hadziidae =====
- Pseudoniphargus grandimanus

===== Ingolfiellidae =====
- Ingolfiella longipes

===== Liljeborgiidae =====
- Idunella sketi

===== Paramelitidae =====
- Aquadulcaris pheronyx
- Austrogammarus australis

===== Phoxocephalidae =====
- Cocoharpinia iliffei

==== Decapoda ====
===== Astacidae =====
- Pacifastacus fortis

===== Atyidae =====
- Atya brachyrhinus
- Caridina apodosis
- Caridina linduensis
- Caridina subventralis
- Caridina tumida
- Caridina yilong
- Edoneus atheatus
- Lancaris kumariae
- Paratya norfolkensis
- Sinodina acutipoda
- Typhlatya iliffei

===== Cambaridae =====
- Cambarellus areolatus
- Cambarellus prolixus
- Cambarus aculabrum
- Cambarus laconensis
- Cambarus obeyensis
- Cambarus subterraneus
- Cambarus tartarus
- Cambarus veitchorum
- Cambarus zophonastes
- Fallicambarus hortoni
- Orconectes sheltae
- Procambarus attiguus
- Procambarus catemacoensis
- Procambarus delicatus
- Procambarus machardyi
- Procambarus morrisi
- Procambarus ortmannii
- Procambarus paradoxus
- Procambarus regiomontanus
- Procambarus rogersi expletus

===== Gecarcinucidae =====
- Ceylonthelphusa callista
- Ceylonthelphusa durrelli
- Ceylonthelphusa kotagama
- Ceylonthelphusa nana
- Ceylonthelphusa nata
- Ceylonthelphusa orthos
- Ceylonthelphusa sanguinea
- Ceylonthelphusa savitriae
- Clinothelphusa kakoota
- Mahatha helaya
- Mahatha iora
- Mahatha lacuna
- Mahatha regina
- Oziotelphusa intuta
- Oziotelphusa kodagoda
- Parathelphusa reticulata
- Perbrinckia cracens
- Perbrinckia enodis
- Perbrinckia fido
- Perbrinckia gabadagei
- Perbrinckia glabra
- Perbrinckia morayensis
- Perbrinckia punctata
- Perbrinckia quadratus
- Perbrinckia rosae
- Perbrinckia scitula
- Phricotelphusa hockpingi

===== Hippolytidae =====
- Barbouria cubensis
- Somersiella sterreri

===== Palaemonidae =====
- Cryphiops brasiliensis
- Cryphiops luscus
- Leptopalaemon glabrus
- Macrobrachium denticulatum
- Macrobrachium oxyphilus
- Macrobrachium purpureamanus
- Macrobrachium scorteccii
- Palaemonetes cummingi
- Palaemonetes lindsayi
- Palaemonetes mesopotamicus
- Palaemonetes mexicanus

===== Parastacidae =====
- Cherax leckii
- Cherax tenuimanus
- Engaeus granulatus
- Engaeus mallacoota
- Engaeus spinicaudatus
- Engaeus sternalis
- Engaewa pseudoreducta
- Euastacus bindal
- Euastacus dalagarbe
- Euastacus dharawalus
- Euastacus eungella
- Euastacus gamilaroi
- Euastacus girurmulayn
- Euastacus guruhgi
- Euastacus guwinus
- Euastacus jagabar
- Euastacus jagara
- Euastacus maidae
- Euastacus mirangudjin
- Euastacus monteithorum
- Euastacus robertsi
- Euastacus setosus
- Euastacus yigara
- Ombrastacoides denisoni
- Ombrastacoides parvicaudatus

===== Potamidae =====
- Geothelphusa lanyu
- Geothelphusa lutao
- Johora singaporensis

===== Potamonautidae =====
- Liberonautes grandbassa
- Liberonautes lugbe

===== Procarididae =====
- Procaris chacei

===== Pseudothelphusidae =====
- Strengeriana antioquensis
- Tehuana veracruzana

===== Sesarmidae =====
- Karstama balicum
- Karstama emdi

==== Isopoda ====
===== Anthuridae =====
- Curassanthura bermudensis

===== Armadillidae =====
- Pseudolaureola atlantica

===== Atlantasellidae =====
- Atlantasellus cavernicolus

===== Cirolanidae =====
- Bermudalana aruboides

===== Sphaeromatidae =====
- Thermosphaeroma cavicauda
- Thermosphaeroma dugesi
- Thermosphaeroma macrura
- Thermosphaeroma smithi

==== Mictacea ====
===== Mictocarididae =====
- Mictocaris halope

==== Mysida ====
===== Mysidae =====
- Bermudamysis speluncola
- Platyops sterreri

=== Maxillopoda ===
==== Calanoida ====
===== Epacteriscidae =====
- Erebonectes nesioticus

===== Pseudocyclopiidae =====
- Paracyclopia naessi

==== Cyclopoida ====
===== Speleoithonidae =====
- Speleoithona bermudensis

==== Misophrioida ====
===== Misophriidae =====
- Speleophria bivexilla
- Speleophria scottodicarloi

==== Platycopioida ====
===== Platycopiidae =====
- Antrisocopia prehensilis
- Nanocopia minuta

=== Ostracoda ===
==== Halocyprida ====
===== Halocyprididae =====
- Spelaeoecia bermudensis

==== Podocopida ====
===== Cyprididae =====
- Kapcypridopsis barnardi

== Chordata ==
=== Actinopterygii ===
==== Acipenseriformes ====
===== Acipenseridae =====
- Acipenser dabryanus
- Acipenser gueldenstaedtii
- Acipenser mikadoi
- Acipenser naccarii
- Acipenser nudiventris
- Acipenser persicus
- Acipenser schrenckii
- Acipenser sinensis
- Acipenser stellatus
- Acipenser sturio
- Acipenser transmontanus (Fraser River Nechako subpopulation)
- Huso dauricus
- Huso huso
- Pseudoscaphirhynchus fedtschenkoi
- Pseudoscaphirhynchus hermanni
- Pseudoscaphirhynchus kaufmanni
- Scaphirhynchus suttkusi

==== Anguilliformes ====
===== Anguillidae =====
- Anguilla anguilla

==== Atheriniformes ====
===== Atherinidae =====
- Poblana alchichica

===== Atherinopsidae =====
- Atherinella jiloaensis

===== Bedotiidae =====
- Bedotia sp. nov. 'Manombo'
- Bedotia sp. nov. 'Sambava'
- Bedotia sp. nov. 'Vevembe'
- Bedotia tricolor
- Rheocles derhami
- Rheocles lateralis

===== Melanotaeniidae =====
- Chilatherina sentaniensis
- Glossolepis wanamensis

===== Pseudomugilidae =====
- Kiunga ballochi
- Scaturiginichthys vermeilipinnis

==== Beloniformes ====
===== Adrianichthyidae =====
- Adrianichthys kruyti
- Xenopoecilus poptae

==== Characiformes ====
===== Alestidae =====
- Rhabdalestes leleupi

===== Characidae =====
- Knodus shinahota

===== Distichodontidae =====
- Neolebias lozii
- Neolebias powelli

===== Lebiasinidae =====
- Nannostomus mortenthaleri

==== Clupeiformes ====
===== Clupeidae =====
- Alosa killarnensis
- Alosa vistonica
- Clupeonella abrau

==== Cypriniformes ====
===== Balitoridae =====
- Barbatula eregliensis
- Mesonoemacheilus herrei
- Nemacheilus dori
- Nemacheilus troglocataractus
- Oxynoemacheilus galilaeus
- Oxynoemacheilus phoxinoides
- Oxynoemacheilus seyhanensis
- Oxynoemacheilus simavica
- Oxynoemacheilus tigris
- Paraschistura chrysicristinae
- Schistura leukensis
- Schistura nasifilis
- Schistura papulifera
- Schistura spiloptera
- Schistura tenura
- Sewellia albisuera
- Sewellia breviventralis
- Sphaerophysa dianchiensis
- Yunnanilus discoloris

===== Catostomidae =====
- Chasmistes liorus
- Xyrauchen texanus

===== Cobitidae =====
- Cobitis illyrica
- Cobitis jadovaensis
- Cobitis kellei
- Cobitis splendens
- Cobitis stephanidisi
- Cobitis taurica
- Parabotia curtus

===== Cyprinidae =====
- Aaptosyax grypus
- Acanthobrama centisquama
- Acanthobrama hadiyahensis
- Acanthobrama tricolor
- Acheilognathus elongatus
- Alburnus macedonicus
- Alburnus mandrensis
- Alburnus nasreddini
- Alburnus timarensis
- Alburnus vistonicus
- Anabarilius andersoni
- Anabarilius qiluensis
- Anabarilius yangzonensis
- Balantiocheilos ambusticauda
- Bangana decorus
- Barbodes amarus
- Barbodes baoulan
- Barbodes clemensi
- Barbodes disa
- Barbodes flavifuscus
- Barbodes herrei
- Barbodes katalo
- Barbodes lanaoensis
- Barbodes manalak
- Barbodes pachycheilus
- Barbodes palata
- Barbodes resimus
- Barbodes tras
- Barbodes truncatulus
- Barbodes wynaadensis
- Barbus euboicus
- Barbus ruasae
- Barbus sp. nov. 'Banhine'
- Caecocypris basimi
- Capoeta pestai
- Catlocarpio siamensis
- Cyprinella alvarezdelvillari
- Cyprinella bocagrande
- Cyprinus barbatus
- Cyprinus carpio (River Danube subpopulation)
- Cyprinus fuxianensis
- Cyprinus ilishaestomus
- Cyprinus micristius
- Cyprinus qionghaiensis
- Cyprinus yunnanensis
- Delminichthys jadovensis
- Delminichthys krbavensis
- Enteromius boboi
- Enteromius carcharhinoides
- Enteromius melanotaenia
- Enteromius treurensis
- Epalzeorhynchos bicolor
- Gila elegans
- Gila modesta
- Gobio delyamurei
- Gobio gymnostethus
- Gobio hettitorum
- Gobio insuyanus
- Hampala lopezi
- Horalabiosa arunachalami
- Hypselobarbus pulchellus
- Hypselobarbus thomassi
- Iberochondrostoma almacai
- Iberochondrostoma lusitanicus
- Iberochondrostoma olisiponensis
- Iberochondrostoma oretanum
- Iberocypris palaciosi
- Labeo curriei
- Labeo lankae
- Labeo victorianus
- Lepidomeda albivallis
- Luciobarbus subquincunciatus
- Moapa coriacea
- Neolissochilus bovanicus
- Notropis moralesi
- Parachondrostoma arrigonis
- Parapsilorhynchus prateri
- Pelasgus epiroticus
- Pelasgus laconicus
- Pethia bandula
- Pethia pookodensis
- Phoxinellus dalmaticus
- Plagopterus argentissimus
- Poropuntius chonglingchungi
- Pseudobarbus burchelli
- Pseudobarbus erubescens
- Pseudobarbus senticeps
- Pseudophoxinus atropatenus
- Pseudophoxinus elizavetae
- Pseudophoxinus hasani
- Pseudophoxinus maeandricus
- Pseudophoxinus ninae
- Pseudophoxinus sojuchbulagi
- Pseudophoxinus syriacus
- Ptychidio jordani
- Puntius deccanensis
- Rhodeus ocellatus smithii
- Scaphognathops theunensis
- Scardinius graecus
- Scardinius racovitzai
- Scardinius scardafa
- Schizothorax grahami
- Schizothorax integrilabiatus
- Schizothorax nepalensis
- Schizothorax raraensis
- Sinocyclocheilus grahami
- Sinocyclocheilus yangzongensis
- Squalius cappadocicus
- Squalius sp. nov. 'Evia'
- Systomus compressiformis
- Tampichthys mandibularis
- Telestes fontinalis
- Telestes polylepis
- Telestes turskyi
- Trigonostigma somphongsi
- Tylognathus festai
- Typhlogarra widdowsoni
- Varicorhinus platystoma
- Xenocypris yunnanensis

===== Psilorhynchidae =====
- Psilorhynchus tenura

==== Cyprinodontiformes ====
===== Cyprinodontidae =====
- Aphanius almiriensis
- Aphanius danfordii
- Aphanius saourensis
- Aphanius sirhani
- Aphanius transgrediens
- Cyprinodon diabolis
- Cyprinodon labiosus
- Cyprinodon meeki
- Cyprinodon pachycephalus
- Cyprinodon verecundus
- Cyprinodon veronicae
- Empetrichthys latos

===== Fundulidae =====
- Lucania interioris

===== Goodeidae =====
- Allotoca diazi
- Allotoca maculata
- Girardinichthys turneri
- Girardinichthys viviparus
- Ilyodon whitei
- Zoogoneticus tequila

===== Nothobranchiidae =====
- Epiplatys coccinatus
- Epiplatys fasciolatus josianae
- Epiplatys ruhkopfi
- Fundulopanchax gardneri lacustris
- Fundulopanchax powelli
- Scriptaphyosemion cauveti
- Scriptaphyosemion etzeli

===== Poeciliidae =====
- Aplocheilichthys sp. nov. 'Baringo'
- Gambusia eurystoma
- Pantanodon sp. nov. 'Manombo'
- Poecilia latipunctata
- Poecilia sulphuraria
- Xiphophorus couchianus

===== Rivulidae =====
- Anablepsoides speciosus
- Aphyolebias claudiae
- Austrolebias cinereus

===== Valenciidae =====
- Valencia hispanica
- Valencia letourneuxi

==== Gadiformes ====
===== Macrouridae =====
- Coryphaenoides rupestris

==== Gasterosteiformes ====
===== Gasterosteidae =====
- Pungitius hellenicus

==== Lophiiformes ====
===== Brachionichthyidae =====
- Brachionichthys hirsutus

==== Ophidiiformes ====
===== Bythitidae =====
- Lucifuga simile

==== Osmeriformes ====
===== Galaxiidae =====
- Galaxias anomalus
- Galaxias cobitinis
- Galaxias eldoni
- Galaxias fontanus
- Galaxias fuscus
- Galaxias gollumoides
- Galaxias johnstoni
- Galaxias macronasus
- Galaxias pedderensis
- Galaxias prognathus
- Galaxias pullus
- Galaxias sp. nov. 'slender'
- Neochanna burrowsius
- Neochanna heleios

===== Osmeridae =====
- Hypomesus transpacificus

==== Perciformes ====
===== Blenniidae =====
- Salaria economidisi

===== Callionymidae =====
- Callionymus sanctaehelenae

===== Cichlidae =====
- Amphilophus zaliosus
- Chromidotilapia guntheri loennbergii
- Haplochromis aelocephalus
- Haplochromis annectidens
- Haplochromis antleter
- Haplochromis apogonoides
- Haplochromis argenteus
- Haplochromis barbarae
- Haplochromis bareli
- Haplochromis beadlei
- Haplochromis brownae
- Haplochromis cassius
- Haplochromis cinctus
- Haplochromis cnester
- Haplochromis coprologus
- Haplochromis crassilabris
- Haplochromis crocopeplus
- Haplochromis dentex
- Haplochromis dichrourus
- Haplochromis flavipinnis
- Haplochromis granti
- Haplochromis guiarti
- Haplochromis heusinkveldi
- Haplochromis hiatus
- Haplochromis iris
- Haplochromis ishmaeli
- Haplochromis katunzii
- Haplochromis latifasciatus
- Haplochromis longirostris
- Haplochromis macrognathus
- Haplochromis martini
- Haplochromis michaeli
- Haplochromis microdon
- Haplochromis mylergates
- Haplochromis nanoserranus
- Haplochromis obesus
- Haplochromis pancitrinus
- Haplochromis parvidens
- Haplochromis percoides
- Haplochromis perrieri
- Haplochromis plutonius
- Haplochromis ptistes
- Haplochromis pyrrhopteryx
- Haplochromis sp. nov. 'Amboseli'
- Haplochromis sphex
- Haplochromis sulphureus
- Haplochromis teegelaari
- Haplochromis teunisrasi
- Haplochromis theliodon
- Haplochromis ushindi
- Haplochromis victorianus
- Haplochromis vonlinnei
- Haplochromis xenostoma
- Konia dikume
- Konia eisentrauti
- Lamprologus kungweensis
- Lipochromis sp. nov. 'backflash cryptodon'
- Lipochromis sp. nov. 'black cryptodon'
- Lipochromis sp. nov. 'parvidens-like'
- Lipochromis sp. nov. 'small obesoid'
- Myaka myaka
- Oreochromis chungruruensis
- Oreochromis esculentus
- Oreochromis hunteri
- Oreochromis jipe
- Oreochromis karomo
- Oreochromis mortimeri
- Oreochromis variabilis
- Orthochromis uvinzae
- Paratilapia sp. nov. 'Vevembe'
- Paretroplus dambabe
- Paretroplus gymnopreopercularis
- Paretroplus maculatus
- Paretroplus menarambo
- Ptychochromis insolitus
- Ptychochromoides betsileanus
- Ptychochromoides itasy
- Ptyochromis sp. nov. 'rainbow sheller'
- Ptyochromis sp. nov. 'Rusinga oral sheller'
- Pungu maclareni
- Sarotherodon caroli
- Sarotherodon linnellii
- Sarotherodon lohbergeri
- Sarotherodon steinbachi
- Stomatepia mariae
- Stomatepia mongo
- Stomatepia pindu
- Teleogramma brichardi
- Tilapia bakossiorum
- Tilapia bemini
- Tilapia bythobates
- Tilapia cessiana
- Tilapia coffea
- Tilapia deckerti
- Tilapia flava
- Tilapia guinasana
- Tilapia gutturosa
- Tilapia imbriferna
- Tilapia snyderae
- Tilapia spongotroktis
- Tilapia thysi
- Xystichromis sp. nov. 'Kyoga flameback'

===== Datnioididae =====
- Datnioides pulcher

===== Elassomatidae =====
- Elassoma alabamae

===== Eleotridae =====
- Mogurnda furva
- Mogurnda variegata
- Typhleotris mararybe
- Typhleotris pauliani

===== Epinephelidae =====
- Epinephelus drummondhayi
- Epinephelus itajara
- Hyporthodus nigritus

===== Gobiidae =====
- Akihito futuna
- Chlamydogobius micropterus
- Chlamydogobius squamigenus
- Gobulus birdsongi
- Knipowitschia cameliae
- Knipowitschia ephesi
- Knipowitschia milleri
- Knipowitschia mrakovcici
- Mugilogobius amadi
- Pandaka pygmaea
- Proterorhinus tataricus
- Stiphodon discotorquatus
- Stiphodon rubromaculatus

===== Labrisomidae =====
- Paraclinus walkeri

===== Osphronemidae =====
- Betta miniopinna
- Betta persephone
- Betta simplex
- Betta spilotogena

===== Percichthyidae =====
- Maccullochella peelii

===== Percidae =====
- Crystallaria cincotta
- Etheostoma chermocki
- Etheostoma marmorpinnum
- Etheostoma percnurum
- Gymnocephalus ambriaelacus
- Percina jenkinsi
- Romanichthys valsanicola
- Zingel asper

===== Polyprionidae =====
- Polyprion americanus (Brazilian subpopulation)
- Stereolepis gigas

===== Pomacentridae =====
- Azurina eupalama

===== Sciaenidae =====
- Bahaba taipingensis
- Sciaena callaensis
- Totoaba macdonaldi

===== Scombridae =====
- Thunnus maccoyii

===== Sparidae =====
- Chrysoblephus cristiceps
- Polysteganus undulosus

==== Percopsiformes ====
===== Amblyopsidae =====
- Speoplatyrhinus poulsoni

==== Salmoniformes ====
===== Salmonidae =====
- Coregonus bavaricus
- Coregonus hoferi
- Coregonus huntsmani
- Coregonus pennantii
- Coregonus reighardi
- Coregonus trybomi
- Hucho bleekeri
- Hucho perryi
- Oncorhynchus apache
- Oncorhynchus formosanus
- Oncorhynchus nerka (COLUMBIA RIVER: Redfish Lk)
- Oncorhynchus nerka (PUGET SOUND-GEORGIA BASIN: Village Bay Ck, Sakinaw)
- Oncorhynchus nerka (SKEENA R, LOWER: Schulbuckhand)
- Oncorhynchus nerka (SKEENA R, MIDDLE: Nanika Lk/Morice R)
- Salmo carpio
- Salmo ezenami
- Salmo platycephalus
- Salmo trutta aralensis (Aral Sea and Amu Darya River stock)
- Salvelinus grayi
- Salvelinus lonsdalii
- Salvelinus obtusus

==== Scorpaeniformes ====
===== Cottidae =====
- Cottus paulus
- Cottus rondeleti

===== Sebastidae =====
- Sebastes paucispinus

==== Siluriformes ====
===== Ariidae =====
- Arius festinus
- Arius uncinatus

===== Astroblepidae =====
- Astroblepus formosus
- Astroblepus ubidiai

===== Bagridae =====
- Hemibagrus punctatus
- Pseudobagrus medianalis

===== Clariidae =====
- Clarias cavernicola
- Clarias maclareni
- Encheloclarias curtisoma
- Encheloclarias kelioides
- Xenoclarias eupogon

===== Heptapteridae =====
- Phreatobius sanguijuela
- Rhamdella montana
- Rhamdia xetequepeque

===== Ictaluridae =====
- Noturus crypticus

===== Loricariidae =====
- Aposturisoma myriodon
- Sturisomatichthys frenatus

===== Mochokidae =====
- Chiloglanis bifurcus
- Chiloglanis polyodon
- Chiloglanis ruziziensis
- Synodontis dekimpei

===== Pangasiidae =====
- Pangasianodon gigas
- Pangasius sanitwongsei

===== Pimelodidae =====
- Pimelodus grosskopfii

===== Siluridae =====
- Ceratoglanis pachynema
- Silurus mento

===== Sisoridae =====
- Glyptothorax kashmirensis
- Glyptothorax kudremukhensis
- Oreoglanis lepturus

===== Trichomycteridae =====
- Rhizosomichthys totae
- Trichomycterus venulosus

==== Syngnathiformes ====
===== Syngnathidae =====
- Syngnathus watermeyeri

==== Tetraodontiformes ====
===== Tetraodontidae =====
- Takifugu chinensis

=== Amphibia ===
==== Anura ====
===== Alsodidae =====
- Alsodes cantillanensis
- Alsodes pehuenche
- Alsodes vanzolinii
- Eupsophus insularis

===== Alytidae =====
- Latonia nigriventer

===== Aromobatidae =====
- Allobates juanii
- Aromobates leopardalis
- Aromobates meridensis
- Aromobates nocturnus
- Mannophryne caquetio
- Mannophryne cordilleriana
- Mannophryne lamarcai
- Mannophryne neblina
- Prostherapis dunni

===== Arthroleptidae =====
- Arthroleptis kidogo
- Arthroleptis kutogundua
- Arthroleptis nikeae
- Arthroleptis troglodytes
- Astylosternus nganhanus
- Cardioglossa manengouba
- Cardioglossa trifasciata
- Leptodactylodon axillaris
- Leptodactylodon erythrogaster
- Leptodactylodon wildi

===== Brevicipitidae =====
- Balebreviceps hillmani
- Callulina dawida
- Callulina hanseni
- Callulina kanga
- Callulina laphami
- Callulina meteora
- Callulina shengena
- Callulina stanleyi

===== Bufonidae =====
- Adenomus dasi
- Adenomus kandianus
- Altiphrynoides osgoodi
- Ansonia guibei
- Atelopus andinus
- Atelopus angelito
- Atelopus ardila
- Atelopus arsyecue
- Atelopus arthuri
- Atelopus balios
- Atelopus bomolochos
- Atelopus boulengeri
- Atelopus carbonerensis
- Atelopus chiriquiensis
- Atelopus chirripoensis
- Atelopus chocoensis
- Atelopus chrysocorallus
- Atelopus coynei
- Atelopus cruciger
- Atelopus ebenoides
- Atelopus elegans
- Atelopus erythropus
- Atelopus eusebianus
- Atelopus eusebiodiazi
- Atelopus famelicus
- Atelopus farci
- Atelopus gigas
- Atelopus glyphus
- Atelopus guanujo
- Atelopus halihelos
- Atelopus ignescens
- Atelopus lynchi
- Atelopus mindoensis
- Atelopus minutulus
- Atelopus monohernandezii
- Atelopus mucubajiensis
- Atelopus nanay
- Atelopus nicefori
- Atelopus nocturnus
- Atelopus onorei
- Atelopus orcesi
- Atelopus oxyrhynchus
- Atelopus pachydermus
- Atelopus palmatus
- Atelopus pastuso
- Atelopus patazensis
- Atelopus pedimarmoratus
- Atelopus peruensis
- Atelopus petersi
- Atelopus petriruizi
- Atelopus pictiventris
- Atelopus pinangoi
- Atelopus planispina
- Atelopus podocarpus
- Atelopus pulcher
- Atelopus pyrodactylus
- Atelopus quimbaya
- Atelopus reticulatus
- Atelopus senex
- Atelopus sernai
- Atelopus simulatus
- Atelopus sonsonensis
- Atelopus sorianoi
- Atelopus subornatus
- Atelopus tamaense
- Atelopus varius
- Atelopus zeteki
- Capensibufo rosei
- Churamiti maridadi
- Incilius cristatus
- Incilius fastidiosus
- Incilius holdridgei
- Incilius peripatetes
- Leptophryne cruentata
- Melanophryniscus admirabilis
- Melanophryniscus langonei
- Melanophryniscus peritus
- Mertensophryne usambarae
- Nectophrynoides laticeps
- Nectophrynoides paulae
- Nectophrynoides poyntoni
- Nectophrynoides pseudotornieri
- Nectophrynoides wendyae
- Nimbaphrynoides occidentalis
- Pelophryne linanitensis
- Pelophryne murudensis
- Peltophryne florentinoi
- Peltophryne fluviatica
- Peltophryne lemur
- Rhinella amabilis
- Rhinella rostrata
- Sclerophrys perreti
- Vandijkophrynus amatolicus
- Werneria bambutensis
- Werneria iboundji
- Werneria tandyi
- Wolterstorffina chirioi
- Xanthophryne tigerina

===== Centrolenidae =====
- Centrolene ballux
- Centrolene gemmatum
- Centrolene heloderma
- Nymphargus anomalus
- Nymphargus armatus
- Nymphargus laurae
- Nymphargus mixomaculatus
- Nymphargus truebae

===== Ceratobatrachidae =====
- Platymantis insulatus

===== Conrauidae =====
- Conraua derooi

===== Craugastoridae =====
- Atopophrynus syntomopus
- Craugastor anciano
- Craugastor andi
- Craugastor angelicus
- Craugastor catalinae
- Craugastor coffeus
- Craugastor cruzi
- Craugastor emcelae
- Craugastor emleni
- Craugastor epochthidius
- Craugastor fecundus
- Craugastor fleischmanni
- Craugastor glaucus
- Craugastor greggi
- Craugastor guerreroensis
- Craugastor gulosus
- Craugastor lineatus
- Craugastor megalotympanum
- Craugastor merendonensis
- Craugastor milesi
- Craugastor obesus
- Craugastor olanchano
- Craugastor omoaensis
- Craugastor polymniae
- Craugastor pozo
- Craugastor ranoides
- Craugastor saltuarius
- Craugastor stadelmani
- Craugastor tabasarae
- Craugastor taurus
- Craugastor trachydermus
- Holoaden bradei
- Noblella madreselva
- Oreobates zongoensis
- Phrynopus heimorum
- Phrynopus juninensis
- Phrynopus peruanus
- Pristimantis albericoi
- Pristimantis bernali
- Pristimantis cosnipatae
- Pristimantis diaphonus
- Pristimantis hamiotae
- Pristimantis jaimei
- Pristimantis kelephus
- Pristimantis lichenoides
- Pristimantis mars
- Pristimantis molybrignus
- Pristimantis phragmipleuron
- Pristimantis simonsii
- Pristimantis spilogaster
- Pristimantis torrenticola
- Pristimantis tribulosus
- Pristimantis veletis
- Pristimantis xylochobates
- Psychrophrynella bagrecito
- Psychrophrynella guillei
- Psychrophrynella illimani
- Psychrophrynella kallawaya
- Psychrophrynella saltator
- Strabomantis cadenai
- Strabomantis helonotus

===== Cycloramphidae =====
- Cycloramphus faustoi
- Rhinoderma rufum

===== Dendrobatidae =====
- Ameerega planipaleae
- Andinobates abditus
- Andinobates viridis
- Colostethus jacobuspetersi
- Hyloxalus anthracinus
- Hyloxalus delatorreae
- Hyloxalus edwardsi
- Hyloxalus ruizi
- Hyloxalus vertebralis
- Minyobates steyermarki
- Oophaga lehmanni
- Oophaga occultator

===== Dicroglossidae =====
- Fejervarya murthii
- Ingerana charlesdarwini
- Nannophrys marmorata

===== Eleutherodactylidae =====
- Eleutherodactylus albipes
- Eleutherodactylus amadeus
- Eleutherodactylus apostates
- Eleutherodactylus bakeri
- Eleutherodactylus bartonsmithi
- Eleutherodactylus blairhedgesi
- Eleutherodactylus bresslerae
- Eleutherodactylus brevirostris
- Eleutherodactylus caribe
- Eleutherodactylus cavernicola
- Eleutherodactylus chlorophenax
- Eleutherodactylus corona
- Eleutherodactylus cubanus
- Eleutherodactylus darlingtoni
- Eleutherodactylus dixoni
- Eleutherodactylus dolomedes
- Eleutherodactylus eneidae
- Eleutherodactylus eunaster
- Eleutherodactylus fowleri
- Eleutherodactylus furcyensis
- Eleutherodactylus fuscus
- Eleutherodactylus glandulifer
- Eleutherodactylus glanduliferoides
- Eleutherodactylus grandis
- Eleutherodactylus griphus
- Eleutherodactylus iberia
- Eleutherodactylus jasperi
- Eleutherodactylus jaumei
- Eleutherodactylus juanariveroi
- Eleutherodactylus jugans
- Eleutherodactylus junori
- Eleutherodactylus karlschmidti
- Eleutherodactylus lamprotes
- Eleutherodactylus leoncei
- Eleutherodactylus locustus
- Eleutherodactylus lucioi
- Eleutherodactylus mariposa
- Eleutherodactylus nortoni
- Eleutherodactylus orcutti
- Eleutherodactylus orientalis
- Eleutherodactylus oxyrhyncus
- Eleutherodactylus parabates
- Eleutherodactylus parapelates
- Eleutherodactylus paulsoni
- Eleutherodactylus pezopetrus
- Eleutherodactylus poolei
- Eleutherodactylus rhodesi
- Eleutherodactylus richmondi
- Eleutherodactylus rivularis
- Eleutherodactylus rufescens
- Eleutherodactylus rufifemoralis
- Eleutherodactylus schmidti
- Eleutherodactylus sciagraphus
- Eleutherodactylus semipalmatus
- Eleutherodactylus sisyphodemus
- Eleutherodactylus symingtoni
- Eleutherodactylus tetajulia
- Eleutherodactylus thorectes
- Eleutherodactylus tonyi
- Eleutherodactylus turquinensis
- Eleutherodactylus ventrilineatus
- Eleutherodactylus warreni

===== Heleophrynidae =====
- Heleophryne rosei

===== Hemiphractidae =====
- Gastrotheca antomia
- Gastrotheca lauzuricae

===== Hylidae =====
- Agalychnis lemur
- Bokermannohyla izecksohni
- Bromeliohyla dendroscarta
- Charadrahyla altipotens
- Charadrahyla trux
- Dendropsophus amicorum
- Dryophytes bocourti
- Duellmanohyla salvavida
- Ecnomiohyla echinata
- Ecnomiohyla rabborum
- Ecnomiohyla salvaje
- Ecnomiohyla valancifer
- Exerodonta perkinsi
- Hyla heinzsteinitzi
- Hyloscirtus chlorosteus
- Hyloscirtus lynchi
- Hyloscirtus pantostictus
- Hyloscirtus ptychodactylus
- Hypsiboas cymbalum
- Isthmohyla angustilineata
- Isthmohyla calypsa
- Isthmohyla debilis
- Isthmohyla graceae
- Isthmohyla insolita
- Isthmohyla rivularis
- Isthmohyla tica
- Litoria booroolongensis
- Litoria castanea
- Litoria lorica
- Litoria myola
- Litoria nyakalensis
- Litoria piperata
- Litoria spenceri
- Megastomatohyla mixe
- Megastomatohyla pellita
- Phytotriades auratus
- Pithecopus ayeaye
- Plectrohyla acanthodes
- Plectrohyla avia
- Plectrohyla calthula
- Plectrohyla calvicollina
- Plectrohyla celata
- Plectrohyla cembra
- Plectrohyla chryses
- Plectrohyla chrysopleura
- Plectrohyla crassa
- Plectrohyla cyanomma
- Plectrohyla dasypus
- Plectrohyla ephemera
- Plectrohyla exquisita
- Plectrohyla guatemalensis
- Plectrohyla hartwegi
- Plectrohyla hazelae
- Plectrohyla ixil
- Plectrohyla pachyderma
- Plectrohyla pokomchi
- Plectrohyla psarosema
- Plectrohyla pycnochila
- Plectrohyla quecchi
- Plectrohyla sabrina
- Plectrohyla siopela
- Plectrohyla tecunumani
- Plectrohyla teuchestes
- Plectrohyla thorectes
- Ptychohyla dendrophasma
- Ptychohyla macrotympanum
- Ptychohyla sanctaecrucis
- Scinax alcatraz
- Scinax faivovichi
- Scinax muriciensis
- Scinax peixotoi

===== Hyperoliidae =====
- Alexteroon jynx
- Hyperolius davenporti
- Hyperolius ruvuensis
- Hyperolius tanneri
- Hyperolius watsonae

===== Leiopelmatidae =====
- Leiopelma archeyi

===== Leptodactylidae =====
- Leptodactylus fallax
- Leptodactylus magistris
- Leptodactylus silvanimbus
- Pleurodema somuncurense

===== Limnodynastidae =====
- Philoria frosti

===== Mantellidae =====
- Boophis ankarafensis
- Boophis baetkei
- Boophis liami
- Boophis tsilomaro
- Boophis williamsi
- Gephyromantis mafy
- Guibemantis diphonus
- Guibemantis punctatus
- Mantella aurantiaca
- Mantella milotympanum
- Mantidactylus pauliani
- Mantidactylus zolitschka
- Spinomantis nussbaumi

===== Megophryidae =====
- Leptobrachella palmata
- Leptolalax botsfordi
- Megophrys damrei
- Oreolalax liangbeiensis
- Oreolalax sterlingae
- Scutiger maculatus

===== Micrixalidae =====
- Micrixalus kottigeharensis

===== Microhylidae =====
- Anodonthyla theoi
- Anodonthyla vallani
- Choerophryne siegfriedi
- Cophixalus concinnus
- Cophyla karenae
- Cophyla maharipeo
- Cophyla puellarum
- Microhyla karunaratnei
- Parhoplophryne usambarica
- Plethodontohyla matavy
- Rhombophryne analamaina
- Rhombophryne hara
- Rhombophryne helenae

===== Myobatrachidae =====
- Geocrinia alba
- Pseudophryne corroboree
- Taudactylus acutirostris
- Taudactylus eungellensis
- Taudactylus pleione
- Taudactylus rheophilus

===== Nyctibatrachidae =====
- Nyctibatrachus dattatreyaensis

===== Odontophrynidae =====
- Proceratophrys moratoi

===== Petropedetidae =====
- Arthroleptides dutoiti

===== Phrynobatrachidae =====
- Phrynobatrachus chukuchuku
- Phrynobatrachus intermedius

===== Pipidae =====
- Xenopus lenduensis
- Xenopus longipes

===== Pyxicephalidae =====
- Arthroleptella rugosa
- Arthroleptella subvoce
- Ericabatrachus baleensis
- Microbatrachella capensis

===== Ranidae =====
- Glandirana minima
- Lithobates chichicuahutla
- Lithobates omiltemanus
- Lithobates pueblae
- Lithobates sevosus
- Lithobates subaquavocalis
- Lithobates tlaloci
- Odorrana wuchuanensis
- Pelophylax cerigensis
- Rana chevronta
- Rana holtzi

===== Ranixalidae =====
- Indirana gundia
- Indirana phrynoderma

===== Rhacophoridae =====
- Philautus jacobsoni
- Philautus sanctisilvaticus
- Pseudophilautus amboli
- Pseudophilautus decoris
- Pseudophilautus limbus
- Pseudophilautus lunatus
- Pseudophilautus macropus
- Pseudophilautus nemus
- Pseudophilautus ocularis
- Pseudophilautus papillosus
- Pseudophilautus procax
- Pseudophilautus simba
- Raorchestes chalazodes
- Raorchestes chlorosomma
- Raorchestes griet
- Raorchestes kaikatti
- Raorchestes marki
- Raorchestes munnarensis
- Raorchestes ponmudi
- Raorchestes resplendens
- Raorchestes shillongensis
- Raorchestes sushili
- Rhacophorus pseudomalabaricus
- Taruga fastigo

===== Sooglossidae =====
- Sechellophryne pipilodryas
- Sooglossus thomasseti

===== Telmatobiidae =====
- Telmatobius atacamensis
- Telmatobius cirrhacelis
- Telmatobius culeus
- Telmatobius dankoi
- Telmatobius espadai
- Telmatobius gigas
- Telmatobius mendelsoni
- Telmatobius niger
- Telmatobius pefauri
- Telmatobius philippii
- Telmatobius timens
- Telmatobius vellardi
- Telmatobius vilamensis

==== Caudata ====
===== Ambystomatidae =====
- Ambystoma amblycephalum
- Ambystoma andersoni
- Ambystoma bombypellum
- Ambystoma dumerilii
- Ambystoma granulosum
- Ambystoma leorae
- Ambystoma mexicanum
- Ambystoma taylori

===== Cryptobranchidae =====
- Andrias davidianus

===== Hynobiidae =====
- Afghanodon mustersi
- Hynobius abei
- Hynobius amjiensis
- Hynobius okiensis
- Iranodon gorganensis

===== Plethodontidae =====
- Aquiloeurycea praecellens
- Aquiloeurycea quetzalanensis
- Bolitoglossa capitana
- Bolitoglossa carri
- Bolitoglossa decora
- Bolitoglossa diaphora
- Bolitoglossa longissima
- Bolitoglossa oresbia
- Bolitoglossa synoria
- Bolitoglossa zapoteca
- Bradytriton silus
- Chiropterotriton arboreus
- Chiropterotriton chiropterus
- Chiropterotriton lavae
- Chiropterotriton magnipes
- Chiropterotriton mosaueri
- Chiropterotriton terrestris
- Cryptotriton monzoni
- Cryptotriton veraepacis
- Dendrotriton bromeliacius
- Dendrotriton chujorum
- Dendrotriton cuchumatanus
- Dendrotriton rabbi
- Isthmura gigantea
- Isthmura naucampatepetl
- Ixalotriton parvus
- Nototriton lignicola
- Nototriton major
- Oedipina altura
- Oedipina maritima
- Oedipina paucidentata
- Oedipina tomasi
- Parvimolge townsendi
- Pseudoeurycea ahuitzotl
- Pseudoeurycea anitae
- Pseudoeurycea aquatica
- Pseudoeurycea aurantia
- Pseudoeurycea brunnata
- Pseudoeurycea exspectata
- Pseudoeurycea goebeli
- Pseudoeurycea juarezi
- Pseudoeurycea kuautli
- Pseudoeurycea mystax
- Pseudoeurycea obesa
- Pseudoeurycea orchileucos
- Pseudoeurycea rex
- Pseudoeurycea robertsi
- Pseudoeurycea saltator
- Pseudoeurycea smithi
- Pseudoeurycea tlahcuiloh
- Pseudoeurycea unguidentis
- Thorius aureus
- Thorius infernalis
- Thorius insperatus
- Thorius magnipes
- Thorius minutissimus
- Thorius munificus
- Thorius narismagnus
- Thorius narisovalis
- Thorius pennatulus
- Thorius smithi
- Thorius spilogaster

===== Salamandridae =====
- Calotriton arnoldi
- Echinotriton chinhaiensis
- Lyciasalamandra billae billae
- Neurergus microspilotus

==== Gymnophiona ====
===== Scolecomorphidae =====
- Crotaphatrema lamottei

=== Aves ===
==== Accipitriformes ====
===== Accipitridae =====
- Buteo ridgwayi
- Chondrohierax wilsonii
- Gyps africanus
- Gyps bengalensis
- Gyps indicus
- Gyps rueppelli
- Gyps tenuirostris
- Haliaeetus vociferoides
- Necrosyrtes monachus
- Nisaetus floris
- Pithecophaga jefferyi
- Sarcogyps calvus
- Trigonoceps occipitalis

==== Anseriformes ====
===== Anatidae =====
- Anas laysanensis
- Aythya baeri
- Aythya innotata
- Mergus octosetaceus
- Rhodonessa caryophyllacea
- Tadorna cristata

==== Apodiformes ====
===== Trochilidae =====
- Amazilia alfaroana
- Coeligena orina
- Eriocnemis godini
- Eriocnemis isabellae
- Eriocnemis nigrivestis
- Eulidia yarrellii
- Lepidopyga lilliae
- Lophornis brachylophus
- Oxypogon cyanolaemus
- Sephanoides fernandensis

==== Bucerotiformes ====
===== Bucerotidae =====
- Anthracoceros montani
- Rhabdotorrhinus waldeni
- Rhinoplax vigil

==== Caprimulgiformes ====
===== Aegothelidae =====
- Aegotheles savesi

===== Caprimulgidae =====
- Eurostopodus exul
- Siphonorhis americana

==== Cathartiformes ====
===== Cathartidae =====
- Gymnogyps californianus

==== Charadriiformes ====
===== Charadriidae =====
- Charadrius obscurus
- Vanellus gregarius
- Vanellus macropterus

===== Glareolidae =====
- Rhinoptilus bitorquatus

===== Laridae =====
- Thalasseus bernsteini

===== Pedionomidae =====
- Pedionomus torquatus

===== Recurvirostridae =====
- Himantopus novaezelandiae

===== Scolopacidae =====
- Calidris pygmaea
- Numenius borealis

===== Turnicidae =====
- Turnix novaecaledoniae

==== Columbiformes ====
===== Columbidae =====
- Alopecoenas erythropterus
- Claravis geoffroyi
- Columba argentina
- Columbina cyanopis
- Didunculus strigirostris
- Gallicolumba keayi
- Gallicolumba menagei
- Gallicolumba platenae
- Leptotila wellsi
- Phapitreron frontalis
- Ptilinopus arcanus

==== Coraciiformes ====
===== Alcedinidae =====
- Alcedo euryzona
- Ceyx sangirensis
- Todiramphus gambieri
- Todiramphus godeffroyi

==== Cuculiformes ====
===== Cuculidae =====
- Carpococcyx viridis
- Centropus steerii

==== Galliformes ====
===== Cracidae =====
- Crax alberti
- Crax pinima
- Pauxi koepckeae
- Pauxi unicornis
- Penelope albipennis
- Pipile pipile

===== Phasianidae =====
- Lophura edwardsi
- Ophrysia superciliosa
- Pternistis ochropectus

==== Gruiformes ====
===== Gruidae =====
- Leucogeranus leucogeranus

===== Psophiidae =====
- Psophia obscura

===== Rallidae =====
- Cyanolimnas cerverai
- Gallirallus lafresnayanus
- Pareudiastes pacificus
- Pareudiastes silvestris
- Sarothrura ayresi

==== Otidiformes ====
===== Otididae =====
- Ardeotis nigriceps
- Houbaropsis bengalensis

==== Passeriformes ====
===== Acrocephalidae =====
- Acrocephalus familiaris
- Acrocephalus hiwae
- Acrocephalus longirostris
- Acrocephalus rimitarae

===== Alaudidae =====
- Alauda razae
- Heteromirafra archeri

===== Callaeidae =====
- Callaeas cinereus

===== Campephagidae =====
- Lalage newtoni

===== Cisticolidae =====
- Apalis fuscigularis
- Artisornis moreaui

===== Corvidae =====
- Cissa thalassina
- Corvus kubaryi
- Corvus unicolor

===== Cotingidae =====
- Lipaugus weberi

===== Dicaeidae =====
- Dicaeum quadricolor

===== Emberizidae =====
- Emberiza aureola

===== Fringillidae =====
- Crithagra concolor
- Hemignathus affinis
- Hemignathus hanapepe
- Loxioides bailleui
- Loxops caeruleirostris
- Loxops ochraceus
- Melamprosops phaeosoma
- Oreomystis bairdi
- Palmeria dolei
- Paroreomyza maculata
- Pseudonestor xanthophrys
- Psittirostra psittacea
- Telespiza ultima

===== Furnariidae =====
- Aphrastura masafucrae
- Cichlocolaptes mazarbarnetti
- Cinclodes aricomae
- Cinclodes palliatus
- Philydor novaesi
- Synallaxis kollari
- Synallaxis maranonica

===== Grallariidae =====
- Grallaria chthonia
- Grallaria fenwickorum

===== Hirundinidae =====
- Eurochelidon sirintarae

===== Icteridae =====
- Icterus northropi

===== Laniidae =====
- Lanius newtoni

===== Leiothrichidae =====
- Garrulax courtoisi
- Garrulax rufifrons
- Liocichla bugunorum

===== Macrosphenidae =====
- Sylvietta chapini

===== Meliphagidae =====
- Anthochaera phrygia
- Gymnomyza aubryana

===== Mimidae =====
- Mimus graysoni
- Toxostoma guttatum

===== Monarchidae =====
- Eutrichomyias rowleyi
- Pomarea iphis
- Pomarea mira
- Pomarea nigra
- Pomarea whitneyi
- Symposiachrus boanensis
- Terpsiphone corvina

===== Muscicapidae =====
- Cyornis ruckii

===== Oriolidae =====
- Oriolus isabellae

===== Pachycephalidae =====
- Coracornis sanghirensis

===== Parulidae =====
- Leucopeza semperi
- Vermivora bachmanii

===== Passerellidae =====
- Atlapetes blancae

===== Pipridae =====
- Antilophia bokermanni

===== Pycnonotidae =====
- Thapsinillas platenae

===== Rhinocryptidae =====
- Merulaxis stresemanni

===== Sturnidae =====
- Acridotheres melanopterus
- Acridotheres tertius
- Acridotheres tricolor
- Aplonis pelzelni
- Gracula robusta
- Gracupica jalla
- Leucopsar rothschildi

===== Thamnophilidae =====
- Cercomacra carbonaria
- Formicivora paludicola
- Myrmotherula snowi
- Terenura sicki

===== Thraupidae =====
- Geospiza heliobates
- Geospiza pauper
- Nemosia rourei
- Rowettia goughensis

===== Troglodytidae =====
- Henicorhina negreti
- Thryophilus nicefori
- Troglodytes monticola

===== Turdidae =====
- Myadestes lanaiensis
- Myadestes palmeri
- Turdus helleri
- Turdus xanthorhynchus

===== Tyrannidae =====
- Calyptura cristata
- Phylloscartes ceciliae

===== Zosteropidae =====
- Cleptornis marchei
- Zosterops albogularis
- Zosterops chloronothos
- Zosterops nehrkorni
- Zosterops rotensis

==== Pelecaniformes ====
===== Ardeidae =====
- Ardea insignis

===== Threskiornithidae =====
- Bostrychia bocagei
- Geronticus eremita
- Pseudibis davisoni
- Thaumatibis gigantea

==== Piciformes ====
===== Picidae =====
- Campephilus imperialis
- Campephilus principalis
- Dendrocopos noguchii

==== Podicipediformes ====
===== Podicipedidae =====
- Podiceps gallardoi
- Podiceps taczanowskii

==== Procellariiformes ====
===== Diomedeidae =====
- Diomedea amsterdamensis
- Diomedea dabbenena
- Phoebastria irrorata

===== Hydrobatidae =====
- Hydrobates macrodactylus

===== Oceanitidae =====
- Fregetta maoriana

===== Procellariidae =====
- Pseudobulweria aterrima
- Pseudobulweria becki
- Pseudobulweria macgillivrayi
- Pterodroma caribbaea
- Pterodroma magentae
- Pterodroma phaeopygia
- Puffinus auricularis
- Puffinus bryani
- Puffinus mauretanicus

==== Psittaciformes ====
===== Cacatuidae =====
- Cacatua haematuropygia
- Cacatua sulphurea

===== Psittacidae =====
- Amazona vittata
- Anodorhynchus glaucus
- Ara glaucogularis
- Charmosyna amabilis
- Charmosyna diadema
- Charmosyna toxopei
- Cyanopsitta spixii
- Cyanoramphus malherbi
- Hapalopsittaca fuertesi
- Lathamus discolor
- Neophema chrysogaster
- Prioniturus verticalis
- Pyrrhura subandina
- Vini ultramarina

===== Strigopidae =====
- Strigops habroptila

==== Strigiformes ====
===== Strigidae =====
- Glaucidium mooreorum
- Otus feae
- Otus siaoensis

==== Suliformes ====
===== Fregatidae =====
- Fregata andrewsi

===== Phalacrocoracidae =====
- Phalacrocorax onslowi

=== Cephalaspidomorphi ===
==== Petromyzontiformes ====
===== Petromyzontidae =====
- Eudontomyzon hellenicus
- Lampetra spadicea

=== Chondrichthyes ===
==== Carcharhiniformes ====
===== Carcharhinidae =====
- Carcharhinus hemiodon
- Glyphis gangeticus
- Glyphis garricki
- Glyphis siamensis
- Isogomphodon oxyrhynchus

===== Scyliorhinidae =====
- Haploblepharus kistnasamyi

===== Triakidae =====
- Mustelus fasciatus

==== Lamniformes ====
===== Lamnidae =====
- Lamna nasus (Mediterranean subpopulation)
- Lamna nasus (Northeast Atlantic subpopulation)

===== Odontaspididae =====
- Carcharias taurus (East coast of Australia subpopulation)
- Carcharias taurus (Southwest Atlantic subpopulation)

==== Myliobatiformes ====
===== Dasyatidae =====
- Maculabatis arabica
- Urogymnus polylepis (Thailand subpopulation)

==== Rajiformes ====
===== Narkidae =====
- Electrolux addisoni

===== Rajidae =====
- Dipturus batis
- Dipturus confusus
- Leucoraja melitensis

===== Torpedinidae =====
- Torpedo suessii

===== Urolophidae =====
- Urolophus javanicus

==== Rhinopristiformes ====
===== Pristidae =====
- Pristis pectinata
- Pristis pectinata (Eastern Atlantic subpopulation)
- Pristis pectinata (Western Atlantic subpopulation)
- Pristis pristis
- Pristis pristis (Eastern Atlantic subpopulation)
- Pristis pristis (Eastern Pacific subpopulation)
- Pristis pristis (Indo-West Pacific subpopulation)
- Pristis pristis (Western Atlantic subpopulation)
- Pristis zijsron

===== Rhinobatidae =====
- Acroteriobatus variegatus
- Pseudobatos horkelii

==== Squaliformes ====
===== Squalidae =====
- Squalus acanthias (Northeast Atlantic subpopulation)

==== Squatiniformes ====
===== Squatinidae =====
- Squatina aculeata
- Squatina oculata
- Squatina squatina

=== Mammalia ===
==== Afrosoricida ====
===== Chrysochloridae =====
- Cryptochloris wintoni
- Neamblysomus julianae (Bronberg Ridge subpopulation)

==== Carnivora ====
===== Canidae =====
- Canis rufus
- Lycaon pictus (North Africa subpopulation)
- Lycaon pictus (West Africa subpopulation)

===== Felidae =====
- Acinonyx jubatus hecki (Northwest African cheetah)
- Acinonyx jubatus venaticus (Asiatic cheetah)
- Lynx lynx balcanicus (Balkan lynx)
- Panthera leo (Lion, West Africa subpopulation)
- Panthera pardus melas (Javan leopard)
- Panthera tigris amoyensis (South China tiger)
- Panthera tigris jacksoni (Malayan tiger)
- Panthera tigris sumatrae (Sumatran tiger)
- Prionailurus bengalensis iriomotensis (Iriomote cat)

===== Mustelidae =====
- Mustela lutreola

===== Procyonidae =====
- Procyon pygmaeus

===== Viverridae =====
- Viverra civettina

==== Cetartiodactyla ====
===== Balaenidae =====
- Eubalaena australis (Chile-Peru subpopulation)
- Eubalaena japonica (Northeast Pacific subpopulation)

===== Balaenopteridae =====
- Balaenoptera edeni (Gulf of Mexico subpopulation)
- Balaenoptera musculus intermedia

===== Bovidae =====
- Addax nasomaculatus
- Alcelaphus buselaphus tora (Tora hartebeest)
- Beatragus hunteri (Hirola)
- Bos sauveli (Kouprey)
- Bubalus mindorensis (Tamaraw)
- Hippotragus niger variani (Giant sable antelope)
- Kobus leche anselli (Upemba lechwe)
- Nanger dama (Dama gazelle)
- Pseudoryx nghetinhensis (Saola)
- Saiga tatarica (Saiga antelope)
- Saiga tatarica tatarica
- Tragelaphus derbianus derbianus (Giant eland)
- Tragelaphus eurycerus isaaci (Bongo)

===== Camelidae =====
- Camelus ferus

===== Cervidae =====
- Axis kuhlii
- Cervus hanglu hanglu
- Muntiacus vuquangensis

===== Delphinidae =====
- Cephalorhynchus hectori maui
- Orcaella brevirostris (Ayeyarwady River subpopulation)
- Orcaella brevirostris (Mahakam River subpopulation)
- Orcaella brevirostris (Malampaya Sound subpopulation)
- Orcaella brevirostris (Mekong River subpopulation)
- Orcaella brevirostris (Songkhla Lake subpopulation)
- Sousa chinensis taiwanensis
- Sousa teuszii
- Tursiops truncatus (Fiordland subpopulation)

===== Eschrichtiidae =====
- Eschrichtius robustus (western subpopulation)

===== Lipotidae =====
- Lipotes vexillifer

===== Monodontidae =====
- Delphinapterus leucas (Cook Inlet subpopulation)

===== Phocoenidae =====
- Neophocaena asiaeorientalis asiaeorientalis
- Phocoena phocoena (Baltic Sea subpopulation)
- Phocoena sinus

===== Suidae =====
- Porcula salvania
- Sus cebifrons

==== Chiroptera ====
===== Emballonuridae =====
- Coleura seychellensis

===== Hipposideridae =====
- Hipposideros hypophyllus
- Hipposideros lamottei

===== Megadermatidae =====
- Eudiscoderma thongareeae

===== Mystacinidae =====
- Mystacina robusta

===== Natalidae =====
- Natalus jamaicensis

===== Phyllostomidae =====
- Phyllonycteris aphylla

===== Pteropodidae =====
- Aproteles bulmerae
- Dobsonia chapmani
- Mirimiri acrodonta
- Pteralopex flanneryi
- Pteralopex pulchra
- Pteropus aruensis
- Pteropus livingstonii
- Pteropus tuberculatus

===== Rhinolophidae =====
- Rhinolophus hilli

===== Vespertilionidae =====
- Murina balaensis
- Murina tenebrosa
- Myotis hajastanicus
- Myotis yanbarensis
- Nyctophilus howensis
- Nyctophilus nebulosus
- Pharotis imogene

==== Dasyuromorphia ====
===== Dasyuridae =====
- Sminthopsis fuliginosus aitkeni

==== Didelphimorphia ====
===== Didelphidae =====
- Marmosops handleyi
- Monodelphis unistriata

==== Diprotodontia ====
===== Burramyidae =====
- Burramys parvus

===== Macropodidae =====
- Dendrolagus mayri
- Dendrolagus pulcherrimus
- Dendrolagus scottae
- Dorcopsis atrata

===== Petauridae =====
- Gymnobelideus leadbeateri
- Petaurus abidi

===== Phalangeridae =====
- Ailurops melanotis
- Phalanger matanim
- Spilocuscus rufoniger
- Spilocuscus wilsoni

===== Potoroidae =====
- Bettongia penicillata (Woylie)
- Potorous gilbertii (Gilbert's potoroo)

===== Pseudocheiridae =====
- Pseudocheirus occidentalis

===== Vombatidae =====
- Lasiorhinus krefftii (Northern hairy-nosed wombat)

==== Eulipotyphla ====
===== Soricidae =====
- Congosorex phillipsorum
- Crocidura andamanensis
- Crocidura harenna
- Crocidura jenkinsi
- Crocidura nicobarica
- Crocidura trichura
- Crocidura wimmeri
- Cryptotis nelsoni
- Myosorex eisentrauti
- Sorex sclateri
- Sorex stizodon

==== Lagomorpha ====
===== Leporidae =====
- Bunolagus monticularis
- Sylvilagus mansuetus

==== Monotremata ====
===== Tachyglossidae =====
- Zaglossus attenboroughi
- Zaglossus bruijnii

==== Perissodactyla ====
===== Equidae =====
- Equus africanus

===== Rhinocerotidae =====
- Ceratotherium simum cottoni (Northern white rhinoceros)
- Dicerorhinus sumatrensis (Sumatran rhinoceros)
- Diceros bicornis (Black rhinoceros)
- Diceros bicornis michaeli (Eastern black rhinoceros)
- Diceros bicornis minor (South-central black rhinoceros)
- Rhinoceros sondaicus (Javan rhinoceros)

==== Pholidota ====
===== Manidae =====
- Manis javanica (Sunda pangolin)
- Manis pentadactyla (Chinese pangolin)

==== Pilosa ====
===== Bradypodidae =====
- Bradypus pygmaeus

==== Primates ====
===== Atelidae =====
- Alouatta guariba guariba
- Alouatta palliata mexicana
- Alouatta palliata trabeata
- Ateles fusciceps
- Ateles fusciceps fusciceps
- Ateles fusciceps rufiventris
- Ateles geoffroyi azuerensis
- Ateles geoffroyi geoffroyi
- Ateles geoffroyi vellerosus
- Ateles hybridus
- Ateles hybridus brunneus
- Ateles hybridus hybridus
- Brachyteles hypoxanthus
- Lagothrix flavicauda
- Lagothrix lugens

===== Callitrichidae =====
- Leontopithecus caissara
- Saguinus oedipus

===== Cebidae =====
- Cebus aequatorialis
- Cebus kaapori
- Sapajus apella margaritae
- Sapajus flavius
- Sapajus xanthosternos

===== Cercopithecidae =====
- Cercopithecus dryas (Dryas monkey)
- Cercopithecus mitis zammaronoi (Blue monkey)
- Macaca nigra (Celebes crested macaque)
- Macaca pagensis (Pagai Island macaque)
- Piliocolobus bouvieri (Bouvier's red colobus)
- Piliocolobus epieni (Niger Delta red colobus)
- Piliocolobus preussi (Preuss's red colobus)
- Piliocolobus waldronae (Miss Waldron's red colobus)
- Presbytis chrysomelas (Sarawak surili)
  - Presbytis chrysomelas chrysomelas
  - Presbytis chrysomelas cruciger
- Presbytis potenziani potenziani (Mentawai langur)
- Pygathrix cinerea (Gray-shanked douc)
- Rhinopithecus avunculus (Tonkin snub-nosed monkey)
- Rhinopithecus strykeri (Myanmar snub-nosed monkey)
- Rungwecebus kipunji (Kipunji)
- Simias concolor (Pig-tailed langur)
  - Simias concolor concolor
  - Simias concolor siberu
- Trachypithecus cristatus vigilans (Silvery lutung)
- Trachypithecus delacouri (Delacour's langur)
- Trachypithecus poliocephalus (White-headed langur)
  - Trachypithecus poliocephalus leucocephalus
  - Trachypithecus poliocephalus poliocephalus (Golden-Headed Langur)
- Trachypithecus vetulus nestor (Western purple-faced langur)

===== Cheirogaleidae =====
- Cheirogaleus sibreei
- Microcebus gerpi
- Microcebus mamiratra
- Microcebus marohita

===== Galagidae =====
- Galagoides rondoensis

===== Hominidae =====
- Gorilla beringei (Eastern gorilla)
- Gorilla beringei beringei (Mountain gorilla)
- Gorilla beringei graueri (Eastern lowland gorilla)
- Gorilla gorilla (Western gorilla)
- Gorilla gorilla diehli (Cross River gorilla)
- Gorilla gorilla gorilla (Western lowland gorilla)
- Pan troglodytes verus (Western chimpanzee)
- Pongo abelii (Sumatran orangutan)
- Pongo pygmaeus (Bornean orangutan)
  - Pongo pygmaeus morio (Northeast Bornean orangutan)
  - Pongo pygmaeus pygmaeus (Northwest Bornean orangutan)
  - Pongo pygmaeus wurmbii (Central Bornean orangutan)
- Pongo tapanuliensis (Tapanuli orangutan)

===== Hylobatidae =====
- Nomascus concolor
- Nomascus concolor concolor
- Nomascus concolor furvogaster
- Nomascus concolor jingdongensis
- Nomascus concolor lu
- Nomascus hainanus
- Nomascus leucogenys
- Nomascus nasutus

===== Indriidae =====
- Indri indri
- Propithecus candidus
- Propithecus diadema
- Propithecus perrieri
- Propithecus tattersalli

===== Lemuridae =====
- Eulemur cinereiceps
- Eulemur flavifrons
- Eulemur mongoz
- Hapalemur alaotrensis
- Hapalemur aureus
- Prolemur simus
- Varecia rubra
- Varecia variegata
- Varecia variegata editorum
- Varecia variegata subcincta
- Varecia variegata variegata

===== Lepilemuridae =====
- Lepilemur fleuretae
- Lepilemur jamesorum
- Lepilemur sahamalaza
- Lepilemur septentrionalis
- Lepilemur tymerlachsoni

===== Lorisidae =====
- Nycticebus javanicus

===== Pitheciidae =====
- Callicebus barbarabrownae
- Chiropotes satanas
- Plecturocebus caquetensis
- Plecturocebus oenanthe

===== Tarsiidae =====
- Tarsius bancanus natunensis
- Tarsius tumpara

==== Proboscidea ====
===== Elephantidae =====
- Elephas maximus sumatranus

==== Rodentia ====
===== Abrocomidae =====
- Abrocoma boliviensis

===== Capromyidae =====
- Mesocapromys nanus
- Mesocapromys sanfelipensis

===== Caviidae =====
- Cavia intermedia

===== Cricetidae =====
- Habromys chinanteco
- Habromys ixtlani
- Habromys lepturus
- Habromys schmidlyi
- Melanomys zunigae
- Microtus bavaricus
- Neotoma nelsoni
- Peromyscus bullatus
- Peromyscus caniceps
- Peromyscus dickeyi
- Peromyscus guardia
- Peromyscus interparietalis
- Peromyscus mayensis
- Peromyscus mekisturus
- Peromyscus pseudocrinitus
- Peromyscus slevini
- Peromyscus stephani
- Reithrodontomys spectabilis
- Tylomys bullaris
- Tylomys tumbalensis

===== Ctenomyidae =====
- Ctenomys osvaldoreigi
- Ctenomys roigi
- Ctenomys sociabilis

===== Dasyproctidae =====
- Dasyprocta mexicana

===== Echimyidae =====
- Phyllomys mantiqueirensis
- Phyllomys unicolor
- Santamartamys rufodorsalis

===== Geomyidae =====
- Heterogeomys lanius
- Pappogeomys bulleri alcorni

===== Heteromyidae =====
- Dipodomys gravipes

===== Muridae =====
- Cremnomys elvira
- Lophuromys eisentrauti
- Melomys fraterculus
- Millardia kondana
- Nilopegamys plumbeus
- Solomys ponceleti
- Tokudaia muenninki
- Uromys boeadii
- Uromys emmae
- Uromys imperator
- Uromys porculus
- Zyzomys palatalis
- Zyzomys pedunculatus

===== Nesomyidae =====
- Dendromus kahuziensis

===== Octodontidae =====
- Octodon pacificus
- Tympanoctomys aureus
- Tympanoctomys loschalchalerosorum

===== Sciuridae =====
- Biswamoyopterus biswasi
- Marmota vancouverensis
- Urocitellus brunneus

=== Myxini ===
==== Myxiniformes ====
===== Myxinidae =====
- Eptatretus octatrema

=== Reptilia ===
==== Crocodylia ====
===== Alligatoridae =====
- Alligator sinensis

===== Crocodylidae =====
- Crocodylus intermedius
- Crocodylus mindorensis
- Crocodylus rhombifer
- Crocodylus siamensis
- Mecistops cataphractus

===== Gavialidae =====
- Gavialis gangeticus

==== Squamata ====
===== Agamidae =====
- Cophotis dumbara
- Phrynocephalus golubewii
- Phrynocephalus horvathi

===== Amphisbaenidae =====
- Amphisbaena cayemite
- Amphisbaena gonavensis
- Amphisbaena leali
- Cynisca gansi
- Cynisca kigomensis

===== Anguidae =====
- Abronia campbelli
- Abronia frosti
- Celestus anelpistus
- Celestus duquesneyi
- Celestus microblepharis
- Celestus occiduus
- Diploglossus montisserrati

===== Boidae =====
- Chilabothrus argentum

===== Calamariidae =====
- Calamaria ingeri
- Calamaria prakkei

===== Carphodactylidae =====
- Phyllurus kabikabi

===== Chamaeleonidae =====
- Brookesia bonsi
- Brookesia desperata
- Calumma hafahafa
- Calumma tarzan
- Furcifer belalandaensis
- Kinyongia mulyai
- Rhampholeon acuminatus
- Rhampholeon bruessoworum
- Rhampholeon chapmanorum
- Rhampholeon hattinghi
- Rhampholeon tilburyi

===== Colubridae =====
- Chironius vincenti
- Dendrophidion boshelli
- Drymoluber apurimacensis
- Gongylosoma mukutense
- Lampropeltis herrerae
- Lycodon chrysoprateros
- Masticophis anthonyi
- Oligodon booliati
- Tantilla insulamontana
- Tantilla petersi
- Tantilla tritaeniata

===== Dactyloidae =====
- Anolis juangundlachi
- Anolis roosevelti

===== Diplodactylidae =====
- Dierogekko inexpectatus
- Dierogekko kaalaensis
- Dierogekko koniambo
- Dierogekko nehoueensis
- Dierogekko poumensis
- Dierogekko thomaswhitei
- Eurydactylodes occidentalis
- Oedodera marmorata

===== Dipsadidae =====
- Alsophis antiguae
- Alsophis antillensis
- Borikenophis sanctaecrucis
- Dipsas albifrons cavalheiroi
- Emmochliophis miops
- Enulius bifoveatus
- Erythrolamprus cursor
- Erythrolamprus ornatus
- Geophis damiani
- Hypsirhynchus ater
- Hypsirhynchus melanichnus
- Ialtris parishi
- Omoadiphas cannula
- Omoadiphas texiguatensis
- Rhadinella tolpanorum
- Sibon merendonensis
- Synophis plectovertebralis
- Trimetopon viquezi

===== Elapidae =====
- Aipysurus apraefrontalis
- Aipysurus foliosquama
- Micrurus ruatanus

===== Eublepharidae =====
- Goniurosaurus toyami
- Goniurosaurus yamashinae

===== Gekkonidae =====
- Alsophylax laevis
- Alsophylax tadjikiensis
- Cnemaspis anaikattiensis
- Cryptactites peringueyi
- Geckoella jeyporensis
- Hemidactylus bouvieri
- Hemidactylus dracaenacolus
- Hemidactylus kundaensis
- Lepidodactylus euaensis
- Lygodactylus mirabilis
- Lygodactylus williamsi
- Paroedura lohatsara
- Phelsuma antanosy
- Phelsuma masohoala
- Phelsuma pronki

===== Gymnophthalmidae =====
- Euspondylus monsfumus
- Ptychoglossus danieli
- Riama rhodogaster

===== Iguanidae =====
- Brachylophus vitiensis
- Conolophus marthae
- Ctenosaura bakeri
- Ctenosaura melanosterna (Cayos Cochinos subpopulation)
- Ctenosaura melanosterna (Valle de Aguán subpopulation)
- Ctenosaura oaxacana
- Cyclura carinata
- Cyclura collei
- Cyclura cychlura figginsi
- Cyclura nubila caymanensis
- Cyclura pinguis
- Cyclura ricordii
- Cyclura rileyi cristata
- Cyclura rileyi rileyi
- Iguana delicatissima

===== Lacertidae =====
- Acanthodactylus beershebensis
- Acanthodactylus harranensis
- Acanthodactylus mechriguensis
- Acanthodactylus spinicauda
- Darevskia dryada
- Eremias pleskei
- Gallotia auaritae
- Gallotia bravoana
- Gallotia intermedia
- Gallotia simonyi
- Iberolacerta martinezricai
- Podarcis raffonei

===== Leiosauridae =====
- Pristidactylus casuhatiensis

===== Leptotyphlopidae =====
- Mitophis asbolepis
- Mitophis calypso
- Mitophis leptepileptus
- Tetracheilostoma carlae

===== Liolaemidae =====
- Liolaemus aparicioi
- Liolaemus azarai
- Liolaemus cranwelli
- Liolaemus curis
- Liolaemus cuyumhue
- Liolaemus paulinae
- Liolaemus rabinoi

===== Natricidae =====
- Natrix natrix cetti
- Natrix natrix schweizeri
- Opisthotropis kikuzatoi

===== Phrynosomatidae =====
- Sceloporus exsul

===== Phyllodactylidae =====
- Homonota rupicola
- Homonota taragui
- Phyllodactylus pulcher
- Phyllodactylus sentosus
- Phyllodactylus sommeri

===== Prosymnidae =====
- Prosymna ornatissima

===== Pseudoxyrhophiidae =====
- Compsophis vinckei
- Pseudoxyrhopus ankafinaensis

===== Scincidae =====
- Alinea lanceolata
- Barkudia insularis
- Bellatorias obiri
- Brachymeles cebuensis
- Capitellum mariagalantae
- Capitellum metallicum
- Capitellum parvicruzae
- Chalcides ebneri
- Ctenotus lancelini
- Ctenotus serotinus
- Emoia slevini
- Geoscincus haraldmeieri
- Gongylomorphus bojerii
- Leiolopisma alazon
- Lerista allanae
- Lerista nevinae
- Lerista vittata
- Lioscincus vivae
- Mabuya hispaniolae
- Mabuya mabouya
- Mabuya montserratae
- Madascincus arenicola
- Marisora roatanae
- Marmorosphax kaala
- Marmorosphax taom
- Nannoscincus exos
- Nannoscincus hanchisteus
- Nannoscincus manautei
- Panaspis annobonensis
- Panopa croizati
- Paracontias fasika
- Paracontias minimus
- Paracontias rothschildi
- Plestiodon longirostris
- Proablepharus barrylyoni
- Pseudoacontias menamainty
- Scelotes inornatus
- Spondylurus anegadeae
- Spondylurus culebrae
- Spondylurus haitiae
- Spondylurus lineolatus
- Spondylurus macleani
- Spondylurus magnacruzae
- Spondylurus martinae
- Spondylurus monae
- Spondylurus monitae
- Spondylurus semitaeniatus
- Spondylurus sloanii
- Spondylurus spilonotus
- Spondylurus turksae

===== Sphaerodactylidae =====
- Aristelliger reyesi
- Gonatodes daudini
- Gonatodes infernalis
- Lepidoblepharis miyatai
- Sphaerodactylus cochranae
- Sphaerodactylus elasmorhynchus
- Sphaerodactylus epiurus
- Sphaerodactylus lazelli
- Sphaerodactylus nycteropus
- Sphaerodactylus samanensis
- Sphaerodactylus schuberti
- Sphaerodactylus sommeri
- Sphaerodactylus williamsi

===== Teiidae =====
- Cnemidophorus vanzoi
- Holcosus orcesi
- Pholidoscelis atratus
- Pholidoscelis corvinus

===== Tropidophiidae =====
- Tropidophis hendersoni

===== Tropiduridae =====
- Leiocephalus altavelensis
- Leiocephalus endomychus
- Leiocephalus onaneyi
- Leiocephalus pratensis
- Leiocephalus rhutidira
- Stenocercus haenschi

===== Typhlopidae =====
- Anilios insperatus
- Typhlops agoralionis
- Typhlops epactius
- Typhlops lazelli
- Xenotyphlops grandidieri

===== Varanidae =====
- Varanus mitchelli

===== Viperidae =====
- Bitis albanica
- Bothrops alcatraz
- Bothrops insularis
- Crotalus catalinensis
- Montivipera wagneri
- Vipera anatolica
- Vipera darevskii
- Vipera orlovi
- Vipera ursinii moldavica

===== Xenodermatidae =====
- Achalinus jinggangensis

==== Testudines ====
===== Chelidae =====
- Chelodina mccordi
- Mesoclemmys dahli
- Mesoclemmys hogei
- Pseudemydura umbrina

===== Cheloniidae =====
- Caretta caretta (North East Indian Ocean subpopulation)
- Caretta caretta (North West Indian Ocean subpopulation)
- Caretta caretta (South Pacific subpopulation)
- Eretmochelys imbricata
- Lepidochelys kempii

===== Dermatemydidae =====
- Dermatemys mawii

===== Dermochelyidae =====
- Dermochelys coriacea (East Pacific Ocean subpopulation)
- Dermochelys coriacea (Southwest Atlantic Ocean subpopulation)
- Dermochelys coriacea (Southwest Indian Ocean subpopulation)
- Dermochelys coriacea (West Pacific Ocean subpopulation)

===== Emydidae =====
- Glyptemys muhlenbergii

===== Geoemydidae =====
- Batagur affinis
- Batagur baska
- Batagur borneoensis
- Batagur kachuga
- Cuora aurocapitata
- Cuora bourreti
- Cuora galbinifrons
- Cuora mccordi
- Cuora pani
- Cuora picturata
- Cuora trifasciata
- Cuora yunnanensis
- Cuora zhoui
- Heosemys depressa
- Leucocephalon yuwonoi
- Mauremys annamensis
- Siebenrockiella leytensis

===== Kinosternidae =====
- Kinosternon sonoriense longifemorale
- Sternotherus depressus

===== Pelomedusidae =====
- Pelusios castanoides intergularis
- Pelusios subniger parietalis

===== Podocnemididae =====
- Erymnochelys madagascariensis
- Podocnemis lewyana

===== Testudinidae =====
- Astrochelys radiata
- Astrochelys yniphora
- Chelonoidis darwini
- Chelonoidis donfaustoi
- Chelonoidis hoodensis
- Chelonoidis phantasticus
- Chelonoidis porteri
- Geochelone platynota
- Psammobates geometricus
- Pyxis arachnoides
- Pyxis planicauda
- Testudo graeca nikolskii
- Testudo kleinmanni

===== Trionychidae =====
- Apalone spinifera atra
- Chitra chitra
- Cyclanorbis elegans
- Rafetus swinhoei
- Trionyx triunguis (Mediterranean subpopulation)

=== Sarcopterygii ===
==== Coelacanthiformes ====
===== Latimeriidae =====
- Latimeria chalumnae

== Cnidaria ==
=== Anthozoa ===
==== Scleractinia ====
===== Acroporidae =====
- Acropora cervicornis
- Acropora palmata

===== Dendrophylliidae =====
- Rhizopsammia wellingtoni
- Tubastraea floreana

===== Poritidae =====
- Porites pukoensis

===== Siderastreidae =====
- Siderastrea glynni

=== Hydrozoa ===
==== Milleporina ====
===== Milleporidae =====
- Millepora boschmai

== Mollusca ==
=== Bivalvia ===
==== Unionida ====
===== Etheriidae =====
- Acostaea rivolii

===== Hyriidae =====
- Hyridella glenelgensis

===== Iridinidae =====
- Aspatharia divaricata

===== Margaritiferidae =====
- Margaritifera auricularia
- Margaritifera hembeli
- Margaritifera margaritifera durrovensis
- Margaritifera marocana

===== Unionidae =====
- Alasmidonta raveneliana
- Amblema neislerii
- Amphinaias couchiana
- Anodonta lucasi
- Anodonta pallaryi
- Coelatura rothschildi
- Cuneopsis demangei
- Cyprogenia stegaria
- Dromus dromas
- Elliptio nigella
- Elliptio steinstansana
- Epioblasma brevidens
- Epioblasma florentina curtisi
- Epioblasma florentina walkeri
- Epioblasma metastriata
- Epioblasma obliquata perobliqua
- Epioblasma othcaloogensis
- Epioblasma penita
- Epioblasma torulosa
- Epioblasma torulosa rangiana
- Fusconaia cor
- Fusconaia mitchelli
- Hemistena lata
- Lamprotula crassa
- Lamprotula liedtkei
- Lamprotula nodulosa
- Lamprotula triclava
- Lampsilis streckeri
- Lampsilis virescens
- Lanceolaria bilirata
- Lasmigona decorata
- Leguminaia saulcyi
- Lemiox rimosus
- Lexingtonia subplana
- Medionidus penicillatus
- Medionidus simpsonianus
- Medionidus walkeri
- Obovaria haddletoni
- Obovaria retusa
- Pegias fabula
- Physunio ferrugineus
- Plethobasus cicatricosus
- Plethobasus cooperianus
- Pleurobema chattanoogaense
- Pleurobema clava
- Pleurobema collina
- Pleurobema curtum
- Pleurobema furvum
- Pleurobema georgianum
- Pleurobema gibberum
- Pleurobema hanleyianum
- Pleurobema marshalli
- Pleurobema plenum
- Pleurobema rubellum
- Popenaias popeii
- Ptychobranchus jonesi
- Quadrula fragosa
- Rhombuniopsis tauriformis
- Theliderma intermedia
- Theliderma sparsa
- Theliderma stapes
- Theliderma tuberosa
- Toxolasma cylindrellus
- Unio foucauldianus
- Villosa perpurpurea
- Villosa trabalis

==== Venerida ====
===== Dreissenidae =====
- Dreissena caspia

===== Sphaeriidae =====
- Eupera crassa
- Pisidium betafoense
- Pisidium ethiopicum

=== Cephalopoda ===
==== Octopoda ====
===== Opisthoteuthidae =====
- Opisthoteuthis chathamensis

=== Gastropoda ===
==== Allogastropoda ====
===== Valvatidae =====
- Cincinna kizakikoensis

==== Architaenioglossa ====
===== Aciculidae =====
- Renea bourguignatiana

===== Ampullariidae =====
- Lanistes neritoides
- Pomacea ocanensis

===== Cyclophoridae =====
- Alycaeus balingensis
- Boucardicus fidimananai
- Boucardicus fortistriatus
- Boucardicus simplex
- Chamalycaeus microconus
- Chamalycaeus mixtus
- Madgeaconcha sevathiani

===== Diplommatinidae =====
- Arinia boreoborneensis
- Arinia dentifera
- Arinia oviformis
- Arinia simplex
- Diplommatina alata
- Diplommatina aurea
- Diplommatina cacuminulus
- Diplommatina crassilabris
- Diplommatina gibboni
- Diplommatina madaiensis
- Diplommatina ringens
- Opisthostoma decrespignyi
- Opisthostoma fraternum
- Opisthostoma inornatum
- Opisthostoma jucundum
- Opisthostoma mirabile
- Opisthostoma otostoma
- Opisthostoma perspectivum
- Opisthostoma thersites
- Opisthostoma trapezium
- Palaina albata
- Palaina moussoni
- Palaina patula
- Palaina platycheilus
- Palaina pupa
- Palaina rubella
- Palaina striolata
- Plectostoma charasense
- Plectostoma dindingensis
- Plectostoma retrovertens
- Plectostoma turriforme
- Pseudopalaina polymorpha

===== Neocyclotidae =====
- Gonatorhaphe lauensis

===== Pupinidae =====
- Notharinia sp. nov. 'Khoe La'
- Notharinia sp. nov. 'Khoe La & Ong'

===== Viviparidae =====
- Bellamya liberiana
- Bellamya mweruensis
- Bellamya pagodiformis
- Bellamya phthinotropis
- Margarya monodi
- Margarya yangtsunghaiensis

==== Cycloneritimorpha ====
===== Helicinidae =====
- Ogasawarana chichijimana
- Ogasawarana habei
- Ogasawarana metamorpha
- Ogasawarana rex
- Ogasawarana yoshiwarana

===== Neritidae =====
- Neritina tiassalensis
- Theodoxus altenai
- Theodoxus baeticus
- Theodoxus valentinus

==== Hygrophila ====
===== Acroloxidae =====
- Acroloxus macedonicus

===== Lymnaeidae =====
- Lantzia carinata
- Lymnaea arachleica
- Stagnicola bonnevillensis
- Stagnicola utahensis

===== Physidae =====
- Physella johnsoni
- Physella wrighti
- Tropinauta sinusdulcensis

===== Planorbidae =====
- Ancylastrum cumingianus
- Ancylus ashangiensis
- Ceratophallus concavus
- Ceratophallus subtilis
- Gyraulus ioanis
- Gyraulus shasi
- Planorbella columbiensis
- Rhodacmea filosa
- Segmentorbis excavatus

==== Littorinimorpha ====
===== Assimineidae =====
- Kubaryia pilikia
- Omphalotropis ingens
- Pseudogibbula cara
- Pseudogibbula duponti
- Septariellina congolensis
- Valvatorbis mauritii

===== Bithyniidae =====
- Bithynia kastorias
- Gabbia alticola
- Gabbiella barthi
- Gabbiella candida
- Gabbiella depressa
- Gabbiella matadina
- Gabbiella neothaumaeformis
- Gabbiella parva
- Incertihydrobia teesdalei
- Jubaia aethiopica
- Pseudobithynia euboeensis
- Pseudobithynia falniowskii
- Pseudobithynia kathrinae
- Pseudobithynia panetolis
- Sierraia outambensis
- Soapitia dageti

===== Cochliopidae =====
- Heleobia dobrogica
- Heleobia tritonum
- Tryonia brunei

===== Hydrobiidae =====
- Alzoniella galaica
- Alzoniella iberopyrenaica
- Alzoniella marianae
- Alzoniella onatensis
- Attebania bernasconii
- Beddomeia tumida
- Belgrandia alcoaensis
- Belgrandia bonelliana
- Belgrandia moitessieri
- Belgrandia varica
- Belgrandiella austriana
- Belgrandiella bachkovoensis
- Belgrandiella boetersi
- Belgrandiella cavernica
- Belgrandiella ganslmayri
- Belgrandiella kreisslorum
- Belgrandiella mimula
- Belgrandiella multiformis
- Belgrandiella parreyssii
- Belgrandiella pelerei
- Belgrandiella styriaca
- Bythinella cylindrica
- Bythinella eutrepha
- Bythinella gloeeri
- Bythinella lunzensis
- Bythinella markovi
- Bythinella turca
- Bythiospeum cisterciensorum
- Bythiospeum dubium
- Bythiospeum gonostoma
- Bythiospeum husmanni
- Bythiospeum pellucidum
- Bythiospeum pfeifferi
- Bythiospeum putei
- Bythiospeum tschapecki
- Bythiospeum turritum
- Bythiospeum wiaaiglica
- Caledoconcha carnosa
- Coahuilix hubbsi
- Costellina turrita
- Dalmatella sketi
- Daphniola louisi
- Delavaya dianchiensis
- Dianella schlickumi
- Dianella thiesseana
- Falsipyrgula beysehirana
- Fluvidona petterdi
- Giustia costata
- Giustia mellalensis
- Giustia saidai
- Gocea ohridana
- Graecoanatolica brevis
- Graecoanatolica conica
- Graecoanatolica vegorriticola
- Graecorientalia vrissiana
- Graziana adlitzensis
- Grossuana thracica
- Hadopyrgus ngataana
- Hadziella rudnicae
- Hauffenia edlingeri
- Hauffenia tovunica
- Heideella sp. nov. 'valai'
- Hemistomia aquilonaris
- Hemistomia crosseana
- Hemistomia gorotitei
- Hemistomia lacinia
- Hemistomia neku
- Hemistomia shostakovichi
- Hemistomia whiteleggei
- Hemistomia xaracuu
- Hemistomia yalayu
- Horatia lucidulus
- Hydrobia anatolica
- Hydrobia rheophila
- Iglica gratulabunda
- Iglica soussensis
- Iglica velkovrhi
- Iglica wolfischeri
- Islamia anatolica
- Islamia bendidis
- Islamia bunarbasa
- Islamia graeca
- Islamia hadei
- Islamia pseudorientalica
- Islamia trichoniana
- Islamia zermanica
- Jardinella colmani
- Kerkia kusceri
- Kirelia carinata
- Kirelia murtici
- Kuschelita inflata
- Kuschelita mica
- Lanzaia skradinensis
- Leiorhagium granum
- Leiorhagium mussorgskyi
- Lyhnidia hadzii
- Lyhnidia karamani
- Lyhnidia stankovici
- Malaprespia albanica
- Marstonia castor
- Marstonia ozarkensis
- Marstoniopsis armoricana
- Marstoniopsis vrbasi
- Mercuria punica
- Mercuria sarahae
- Ohridohauffenia minuta
- Paladilhiopsis janinensis
- Paladilhiopsis neaaugustensis
- Parabythinella graeca
- Parabythinella malaprespensis
- Plagigeyeria montenigrina
- Plagigeyeria tribunicae
- Potamopyrgus acus
- Potamopyrgus oppidanus
- Prespolitorea malaprespensis
- Prespolitorea valvataeformis
- Pseudamnicola leprevieri
- Pseudamnicola pallaryi
- Pseudoislamia balcanica
- Pyrgohydrobia jablanicensis
- Pyrgulopsis bruneauensis
- Pyrgulopsis erythropoma
- Pyrgulopsis neomexicana
- Pyrgulopsis thermalis
- Pyrgulopsis trivialis
- Pyrgulopsis ventricosa
- Radomaniola elongata
- Radomaniola lacustris
- Sadleriana cavernosa
- Sardohoratia sulcata
- Saxurinator labiatus
- Saxurinator orthodoxus
- Somatogyrus coosaensis
- Somatogyrus crassus
- Somatogyrus currierianus
- Somatogyrus hendersoni
- Somatogyrus humerosus
- Somatogyrus nanus
- Somatogyrus pygmaeus
- Somatogyrus quadratus
- Somatogyrus strengi
- Somatogyrus tennesseensis
- Stankovicia baicaliiformis
- Tanousia zrmanjae
- Tarraconia gasulli
- Trachyochridia filocincta
- Trichonia trichonica
- Vinodolia hadouphylax
- Vinodolia lacustris
- Vinodolia matjasici
- Zaumia kusceri
- Zaumia sanctizaumi

===== Moitessieriidae =====
- Henrigirardia wienini
- Spiralix corsica

===== Pomatiopsidae =====
- Tomichia cawstoni
- Tomichia natalensis
- Tomichia tristis

==== Neogastropoda ====
===== Conidae =====
- Conus lugubris
- Conus mordeirae
- Conus salreiensis

==== Sacoglossa ====
===== Siphonariidae =====
- Siphonaria compressa

==== Sorbeoconcha ====
===== Melanopsidae =====
- Melanopsis ammonis
- Melanopsis brevicula
- Melanopsis chlorotica
- Melanopsis germaini
- Melanopsis infracincta
- Melanopsis khabourensis
- Melanopsis pachya
- Melanopsis parreyssii
- Melanopsis penchinati
- Melanopsis saharica

===== Pachychilidae =====
- Madagasikara zazavavindrano
- Potadoma kadeii
- Potadoma wansoni
- Tylomelania kruimeli

===== Paludomidae =====
- Cleopatra cridlandi
- Pseudocleopatra dartevellei

===== Pleuroceridae =====
- Elimia ampla
- Elimia annettae
- Elimia bellacrenata
- Elimia troostiana
- Leptoxis melanoides
- Leptoxis plicata
- Pleurocera corpulenta

===== Thiaridae =====
- Melanoides agglutinans

==== Stylommatophora ====
===== Achatinellidae =====
- Achatinella apexfulva
- Achatinella bellula
- Achatinella bulimoides
- Achatinella byronii
- Achatinella cestus
- Achatinella concavospira
- Achatinella curta
- Achatinella decipiens
- Achatinella fulgens
- Achatinella fuscobasis
- Achatinella leucorrhaphe
- Achatinella lila
- Achatinella lorata
- Achatinella mustelina
- Achatinella phaeozona
- Achatinella pulcherrima
- Achatinella pupukanioe
- Achatinella sowerbyana
- Achatinella stewartii
- Achatinella swiftii
- Achatinella taeniolata
- Achatinella turgida
- Achatinella viridans
- Achatinella vulpina
- Gulickia alexandri
- Partulina confusa
- Partulina dubia

===== Amastridae =====
- Amastra cylindrica
- Amastra micans
- Amastra rubens
- Amastra spirizona
- Armsia petasus
- Laminella sanguinea
- Tropidoptera heliciformis

===== Arionidae =====
- Arion luisae

===== Bradybaenidae =====
- Helicostyla smargadina

===== Cerastidae =====
- Pachnodus oxoniensis
- Rhachistia aldabrae

===== Cerionidae =====
- Cerion nanus

===== Charopidae =====
- Charopa lafargei
- Helenoconcha relicta
- Kondoconcha othnius
- Lauopa mbalavuana
- Maafu thaumasius
- Mautodontha boraborensis
- Mautodontha ceuthma
- Opanara altiapica
- Opanara areaensis
- Opanara bitridentata
- Opanara caliculata
- Opanara depasoapicata
- Opanara duplicidentata
- Opanara fosbergi
- Opanara megomphala
- Opanara perahuensis
- Orangia maituatensis
- Palline notera
- Radioconus goeldi
- Rhysoconcha variumbilicata
- Ruatara koarana
- Semperdon kororensis
- Semperdon xyleborus
- Sinployea angularis
- Sinployea navutuenis
- Trachycystis clifdeni
- Trachycystis placenta
- Vatusila kondoi
- Vatusila nayauana

===== Clausiliidae =====
- Albinaria mavromoustakisi
- Albinaria rechingeri
- Albinaria retusa
- Boettgeria obesiuscula
- Carinigera drenovoensis
- Charpentieria crassicostata
- Charpentieria ferrox
- Charpentieria spezialensis
- Lampedusa melitensis
- Macedonica martae
- Tsoukatosia evauemgei

===== Cochlicellidae =====
- Monilearia arguineguinensis
- Monilearia granostriata
- Monilearia pulverulenta
- Monilearia tumulorum

===== Cochlicopidae =====
- Cryptazeca elongata

===== Discidae =====
- Atlantica calathoides
- Atlantica engonata
- Atlantica gomerensis
- Atlantica guerinianus
- Atlantica putrescens

===== Draparnaudiidae =====
- Draparnaudia anniae
- Draparnaudia subnecata

===== Dyakiidae =====
- Bertia cambojiensis

===== Endodontidae =====
- Aaadonta angaurana
- Aaadonta constricta babelthuapi
- Aaadonta constricta constricta
- Aaadonta constricta komakanensis
- Aaadonta fuscozonata depressa
- Aaadonta fuscozonata fuscozonata
- Aaadonta irregularis
- Aaadonta kinlochi
- Aaadonta pelewana
- Cookeconcha contorta
- Endodonta apiculata
- Priceconcha tuvuthaensis
- Thaumatodon corrugata
- Thaumatodon spirrhymatum

===== Enidae =====
- Euchondrus ramonensis
- Napaeus arinagaensis
- Napaeus dolorosae
- Napaeus exilis
- Napaeus isletae
- Napaeus osoriensis
- Napaeus teobaldoi
- Pene galilaea

===== Euconulidae =====
- Dupontia levensonia
- Trochochlamys ogasawarana

===== Ferussaciidae =====
- Cecilioides eulima
- Cecilioides jeskalovicensis

===== Gastrodontidae =====
- Janulus pompylius

===== Helicarionidae =====
- Coneuplecta turrita
- Erepta stylodon
- Harmogenanina implicata
- Sesara sp. nov. 'Bai Voi'
- Zingis radiolata

===== Helicidae =====
- Assyriella rechingeri
- Chilostoma crombezi
- Chilostoma harpya
- Hemicycla efferata
- Hemicycla mascaensis
- Hemicycla modesta
- Hemicycla paeteliana
- Hemicycla plicaria
- Hemicycla saulcyi
- Idiomela subplicata
- Tacheocampylaea romagnolii
- Theba arinagae
- Tyrrhenaria ceratina
- Tyrrheniberus sardonius

===== Helicodiscidae =====
- Zilchogyra paulistana

===== Helminthoglyptidae =====
- Helminthoglypta walkeriana
- Micrarionta feralis

===== Hygromiidae =====
- Actinella arridens
- Actinella obserata
- Canariella jandiaensis
- Canariella ronceroi
- Caseolus subcalliferus
- Cernuella amanda
- Cernuella aradasii
- Discula bulverii
- Discula lyelliana
- Discula tabellata
- Discula testudinalis
- Discula tetrica
- Geomitra coronula
- Geomitra delphinuloides
- Geomitra grabhami
- Hystricella vermetiformis
- Ichnusomunda sacchii
- Lemniscia galeata
- Leptaxis vetusa
- Montserratina becasis
- Pyrenaearia molae
- Serratorotula acarinata
- Trochoidea pseudojacosta
- Wollastonaria jessicae
- Wollastonaria klausgrohi
- Xerosecta giustii
- Xerotricha garachicoensis

===== Lauriidae =====
- Leiostyla abbreviata
- Leiostyla cassida
- Leiostyla cassidula
- Leiostyla gibba
- Leiostyla simulator

===== Milacidae =====
- Tandonia lagostana

===== Orculidae =====
- Orcula fuchsi

===== Oreohelicidae =====
- Radiocentrum avalonense

===== Orthalicidae =====
- Bulimulus achatellinus
- Bulimulus adelphus
- Bulimulus adserseni
- Bulimulus chemitzioides
- Bulimulus curtus
- Bulimulus deridderi
- Bulimulus duncanus
- Bulimulus eos
- Bulimulus eschariferus
- Bulimulus galapaganus
- Bulimulus habeli
- Bulimulus hirsutus
- Bulimulus indefatigabilis
- Bulimulus jacobi
- Bulimulus lycodus
- Bulimulus ochsneri
- Bulimulus reibischi
- Bulimulus saeronius
- Bulimulus sculpturatus
- Bulimulus sp. nov. 'josevillani'
- Bulimulus sp. nov. 'krameri'
- Bulimulus sp. nov. 'nilsodhneri'
- Bulimulus sp. nov. 'tuideroyi'
- Bulimulus sp. nov. 'vanmoli'
- Bulimulus tanneri
- Bulimulus wolfi
- Leuchocharis pancheri
- Placostylus bivaricosus
- Placostylus koroensis
- Placostylus mbengensis

===== Oxychilidae =====
- Mediterranea amaltheae
- Oxychilus agostinhoi

===== Parmacellidae =====
- Cryptella alegranzae
- Cryptella tamaranensis

===== Partulidae =====
- Eua globosa
- Palaopartula calypso
- Palaopartula leucothoe
- Partula affinis
- Partula clara
- Partula emersoni
- Partula gibba
- Partula guamensis
- Partula langfordi
- Partula meyeri
- Partula otaheitana
- Partula radiolata
- Partula taeniata
- Samoana abbreviata
- Samoana attenuata
- Samoana bellula
- Samoana burchi
- Samoana cramptoni
- Samoana decussatula
- Samoana dryas
- Samoana fragilis

===== Polygyridae =====
- Inflectarius magazinensis

===== Pristilomatidae =====
- Lindbergia beroni
- Lindbergia gittenbergeri
- Vermetum festinans
- Vitrea pieperiana
- Vitrea striata

===== Pupillidae =====
- Gyliotrachela luctans

===== Rhytididae =====
- Delos gardineri
- Natalina beyrichi
- Ouagapia ratusukuni
- Rhytida clarki
- Rhytida oconnori

===== Streptaxidae =====
- Conturbatia crenata
- Glabrennea silhouettensis
- Glabrennea thomasseti
- Gonospira duponti
- Gulella puzeyi
- Gulella salpinx
- Priodiscus spinosus

===== Strophocheilidae =====
- Gonyostomus gonyostomus
- Hirinaba curytibana
- Megalobulimus grandis
- Megalobulimus proclivis

===== Succineidae =====
- Oxyloma kanabense
- Succinea rotumana

===== Trochomorphidae =====
- Videna pagodula
- Videna pumila

===== Vertiginidae =====
- Hypselostoma elephas
- Paraboysidia serpa

===== Vitrinidae =====
- Plutonia angulosa
- Plutonia falcifera
- Plutonia machadoi
- Plutonia reticulata

===== Zonitidae =====
- Trochomorpha kambarae
- Trochomorpha moalensis
- Trochomorpha planoconus
- Trochomorpha tuvuthae
- Zonites astakidae
- Zonites embolium
- Zonites invitus
- Zonites nautarum

==== Vetigastropoda ====
===== Haliotidae =====
- Haliotis cracherodii

== Nemertina ==
=== Enopla ===
==== Hoplonemertea ====
===== Prosorhochmidae =====
- Prosadenoporus agricola

== Onychophora ==
=== Onychophora ===
==== Onychophora ====
===== Peripatidae =====
- Speleoperipatus spelaeus

===== Peripatopsidae =====
- Opisthopatus roseus
- Peripatopsis leonina
