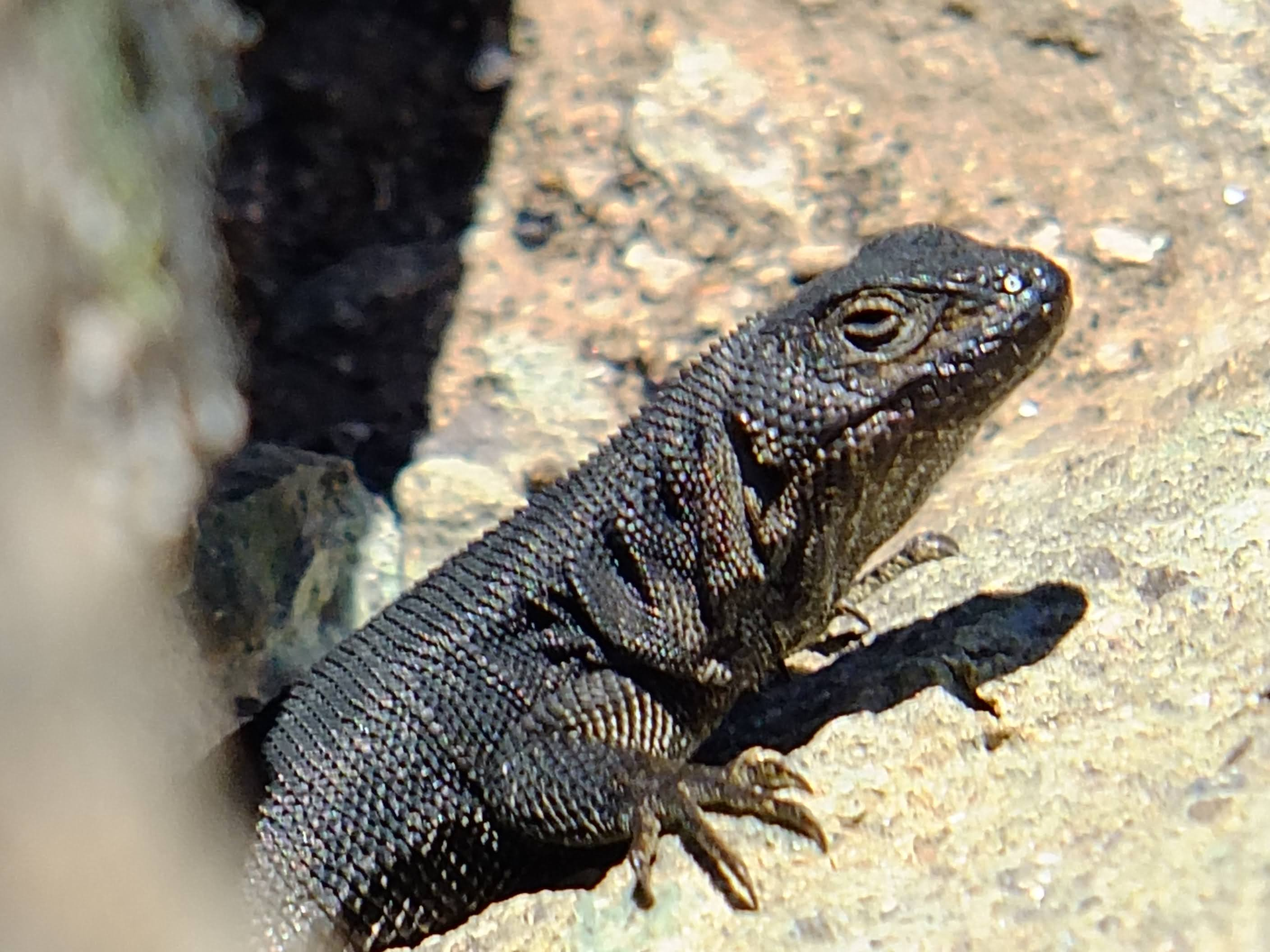

Conservation status
- Critically Endangered (IUCN 3.1)

Scientific classification
- Kingdom: Animalia
- Phylum: Chordata
- Class: Reptilia
- Order: Squamata
- Suborder: Iguania
- Family: Liolaemidae
- Genus: Liolaemus
- Species: L. curis

Binomial name
- Liolaemus curis Núñez & Labra, 1985

= Liolaemus curis =

Species of lizard

Liolaemus curis, Nuñez's tree iguana, is a species of lizard in the family Liolaemidae. It is endemic to Chile.
