= Rhinella amabilis =

Conservation status
- Critically Endangered (IUCN 3.1)

Scientific classification
- Kingdom: Animalia
- Phylum: Chordata
- Class: Amphibia
- Order: Anura
- Family: Bufonidae
- Genus: Rhinella
- Species: R. amabilis

Binomial name
- Rhinella amabilis (Pramuk and Kadivar, 2003)

Synonyms
- Bufo amabilis Pramuk and Kadivar, 2003; Chaunus amabilis (Pramuk and Kadivar, 2003)

Species of amphibian

Rhinella amabilis is a species of toads in the family Bufonidae that is endemic to Ecuador, only occurring in a severely fragmented area less than 100 square kilometres (39 sq mi).

== Description ==
Males measure 49–97 mm (1.9–3.8 in) and females 50–85 mm (2.0–3.3 in) in snout–vent length.

== Range ==
This species is known only from elevations of 2,050 to 2,200 metres (6,730–7,220 ft) above sea level in the Loja Basin, an inter-Andean valley in Loja Province, Ecuador. It has a restricted distribution, as surveys have confirmed.

== Conservation status ==
It is currently listed as Critically Endangered, in view of its small and fragmentary extent of occurrence and the fact that there is a continuing decline in the extent and quality of its habitat.

The apparent declines of this species might in part be due to the modification of much of the Loja basin area for agriculture, urbanization, and other regional development. It appears that populations of this toad in the area surrounding Provincia Loja have been severely affected by human activities. Disease might also be a factor but there is no evidence to confirm this.

== Population ==
Past collections indicate that the species was fairly common at areas nearby creeks, even near plantations; however, surveys undertaken between 1989 and 2001 failed to find the species. It appears that it has not been collected since 1968, and a serious decrease might have taken place.

== Habitat and ecology ==
The species has been collected in small pools and irrigation canals. Little is known of its habitat requirements or ecology, but breeding is presumed to take place in freshwater by larval development. It is active by night.
