= Bulimulus wolfi =

Conservation status
- Critically Endangered (IUCN 3.1)

Scientific classification
- Kingdom: Animalia
- Phylum: Mollusca
- Class: Gastropoda
- Order: Stylommatophora
- Family: Bulimulidae
- Genus: Bulimulus
- Species: B. wolfi

Binomial name
- Bulimulus wolfi (Reibisch, 1892)

Species of gastropod

Bulimulus wolfi is a species of tropical air-breathing land snail, a pulmonate gastropod mollusk in the subfamily Bulimulinae.

This species is endemic to Ecuador. Its natural habitats are subtropical or tropical dry shrubland and subtropical or tropical dry lowland grassland. It is threatened by habitat loss.
