= Gobio delyamurei =

Conservation status
- Critically Endangered (IUCN 3.1)

Scientific classification
- Kingdom: Animalia
- Phylum: Chordata
- Class: Actinopterygii
- Order: Cypriniformes
- Family: Gobionidae
- Genus: Gobio
- Species: G. delyamurei

Binomial name
- Gobio delyamurei Freyhof & Naseka, 2005

Synonyms
- Gobio tauricus Vasil'eva, 2005

Species of fish

Gobio delyamurei, also termed the Chornaya gudgeon, is a species of gudgeon, a small freshwater fish in the family Cyprinidae, native to Crimea. It is considered to be critically endangered, as it lives only along a 1-km stretch in the Chornaya River, below the Chornaya Gorge. Because of water abstraction, the site is vulnerable to drying up in the summer time, particularly if climate change will further intensify the droughts.

This is a demersal fish, up to 10.4 cm long. It was described as an independent species in 2005.

Named in honor of Soviet ichthyologist Semion Lyudvigovich Delyamure, author of several papers and books on Crimean fishes.
