= Thoracistus arboreus =

Conservation status
- Critically Endangered (IUCN 3.1)

Scientific classification
- Domain: Eukaryota
- Kingdom: Animalia
- Phylum: Arthropoda
- Class: Insecta
- Order: Orthoptera
- Suborder: Ensifera
- Family: Tettigoniidae
- Genus: Thoracistus
- Species: T. arboreus

Binomial name
- Thoracistus arboreus (Rentz, 1988)

Species of cricket-like animal

Thoracistus arboreus, the arboreal seedpod shieldback, is a species of katydid in the family Tettigoniidae. The species is endemic to Clarens, South Africa.
