= Atelopus senex =

Conservation status
- Extinct (IUCN 3.1)

Scientific classification
- Kingdom: Animalia
- Phylum: Chordata
- Class: Amphibia
- Order: Anura
- Family: Bufonidae
- Genus: Atelopus
- Species: †A. senex

Binomial name
- †Atelopus senex Taylor, 1952

Extinct species of amphibian

Atelopus senex (common name: pass stubfoot toad) is an extinct species of toad in the family Bufonidae. It was endemic to Costa Rica and known from the Cordillera Central and Cordillera de Talamanca at elevations of 1,100–2,200 m (3,600–7,200 ft) asl.

== Description ==
Males measure 28–32 mm (1.1–1.3 in) and females 30–43 mm (1.2–1.7 in) in snout–vent length. Males are bluish gray, blue-green, black, or occasionally greenish, without patterning. Females may have patterning consisting of cream, lemon, or lime-coloured lighter areas.

== Habitat and conservation ==
Its natural habitats are stream margins in premontane and lower montane rainforests. It was formerly abundant but has seen a drastic population decline. Last seen in 1986, it might already be extinct. Its decline is likely to have been caused by chytridiomycosis, although climate change, pet trade, and pollution are also possible threats.
