= Hemidactylus dracaenacolus =

Conservation status
- Critically Endangered (IUCN 3.1)

Scientific classification
- Kingdom: Animalia
- Phylum: Chordata
- Class: Reptilia
- Order: Squamata
- Suborder: Gekkota
- Family: Gekkonidae
- Genus: Hemidactylus
- Species: H. dracaenacolus

Binomial name
- Hemidactylus dracaenacolus Rösler & Wranik, 1999

Species of lizard

Hemidactylus dracaenacolus is a species of gecko endemic to Socotra. They are critically endangered and live among Socotra dragon trees.
