= Pristimantis jaimei =

Conservation status
- Critically Endangered (IUCN 3.1)

Scientific classification
- Kingdom: Animalia
- Phylum: Chordata
- Class: Amphibia
- Order: Anura
- Clade: Brachycephaloidea
- Family: Craugastoridae
- Genus: Pristimantis
- Species: P. jaimei

Binomial name
- Pristimantis jaimei (Lynch, 1992)

Synonyms
- Eleutherodactylus jaimei Lynch, 1992

Species of frog

Pristimantis jaimei is a species of frog in the family Strabomantidae. It is endemic to Colombia. Its natural habitats are tropical moist lowland forests and moist montane forests. It is threatened by habitat loss.
