= Pristimantis molybrignus =

Conservation status
- Critically Endangered (IUCN 3.1)

Scientific classification
- Kingdom: Animalia
- Phylum: Chordata
- Class: Amphibia
- Order: Anura
- Clade: Brachycephaloidea
- Family: Craugastoridae
- Genus: Pristimantis
- Species: P. molybrignus

Binomial name
- Pristimantis molybrignus (Lynch, 1986)

Synonyms
- Eleutherodactylus molybrignus Lynch, 1986

Species of frog

Pristimantis molybrignus is a species of frog in the family Strabomantidae. It is endemic to Colombia. Its natural habitats are tropical moist montane forests, rivers, and heavily degraded former forest.
