= Nerillida =

Scientific classification
- Kingdom: Animalia
- Phylum: Annelida
- Class: Polychaeta
- Order: Nerillida

Order of annelids

Nerillida is an order of annelid worms in the class Polychaeta. It contains Mesonerilla prospera, a critically endangered species on the IUCN Red List.
