= Oxynoemacheilus phoxinoides =

Conservation status
- Critically Endangered (IUCN 3.1)

Scientific classification
- Kingdom: Animalia
- Phylum: Chordata
- Class: Actinopterygii
- Order: Cypriniformes
- Family: Nemacheilidae
- Genus: Oxynoemacheilus
- Species: O. phoxinoides

Binomial name
- Oxynoemacheilus phoxinoides (Erk'akan, Nalbant & Özeren, 2007)

Synonyms
- Barbatula phoxinoides Erk'Akan, Nalbant & Özeren, 2007

Species of fish

Oxynoemacheilus phoxinoides, the Iznik loach, is a species of ray-finned fish in the genus Oxynoemacheilus. The species is endemic to a single small stream, less than 5 km in length in the drainage of Lake Iznik in north-western Anatolia, Turkey. The species is abundant in its restricted habitat but the population seems to be declining with abstraction of water from the stream for irrigation thought to be the main threat but as climate changed reduces the rainfall in the region the likelihood of droughts is increased.
