= Atelopus andinus =

Conservation status
- Endangered (IUCN 3.1)

Scientific classification
- Kingdom: Animalia
- Phylum: Chordata
- Class: Amphibia
- Order: Anura
- Family: Bufonidae
- Genus: Atelopus
- Species: A. andinus

Binomial name
- Atelopus andinus Rivero, 1968

Synonyms
- Atelopus spumarius andinus Rivero, 1968; Atelopus pulcher andinus Peters, 1973

Species of amphibian

Atelopus andius is a species of toad that is endemic to the submontane and riparian forests of eastern Peru. It is currently listed as endangered by the IUCN.

== Taxonomy ==
A.andinus was originally described as a subspecies of Atelopus squmaris , being Atelopus squmaris andinus as Atelopus pulcher was considered to be a synonym. After A.pulcher was revived, the subspecies was subsequently changed to be Atelopus pulcher andinus. In 1970, A. andinus was found to be different enough to be at species level, given it was more similar to Atelopus tricolor then A.squmaris.

== Description ==
A.andinus like other species in its genus, is rather colorful compared to other toads, with green, black, and red. It has splotches of green on its body, with light red toe tips, as well as a red splotch near the thigh.

Distinguishing it from other species, A. andinus has a densely spinulous skin, being prominent on the eyelids, posterior half, and the sides on the dorsum, the dorsolateral band and dorsal spots are more tan.

== Distribution and habitat ==
A. andinus is endemic to Peru, and can only be found in the upper Rio Biabo valley in San Martin, Rio Pisqui in Loreno and the Rio Cachiyacu in between. It generally ranges in heights up to 1,000–2,000 m (3,300–6,600 ft).

A. andinus lives in the riparian and old growth submontane forests of Peru. They prefer to live near streams, and breed in ones that are fast flowing.

== Status and conservation ==
As of 2018 A. andinus is listed as Endangered by the IUCN. This is due to several factors such as logging, agriculture and, the deadly fungus Chytridiomycosis.
