= Pyrgacris =

Scientific classification
- Kingdom: Animalia
- Phylum: Arthropoda
- Clade: Pancrustacea
- Class: Insecta
- Order: Orthoptera
- Suborder: Caelifera
- Nanorder: Acridomorpha
- Superfamily: Acridoidea
- Family: Pyrgacrididae; Kevan, 1974
- Genus: Pyrgacris; Descamps, 1968

Genus of grasshoppers

Pyrgacris is a small genus of grasshoppers in the monotypic family Pyrgacrididae. The two species in the genus Pyrgacris are found only on Reunion Island.

== Species ==
As of 2019, Orthoptera Species File lists:

- Pyrgacris descampsi Kevan, 1976
- Pyrgacris relictus Descamps, 1968 - type species
