= Sceloporus exsul =

Conservation status
- Critically Endangered (IUCN 3.1)

Scientific classification
- Domain: Eukaryota
- Kingdom: Animalia
- Phylum: Chordata
- Class: Reptilia
- Order: Squamata
- Suborder: Iguania
- Family: Phrynosomatidae
- Genus: Sceloporus
- Species: S. exsul

Binomial name
- Sceloporus exsul Dixon, Ketchersid, & Lieb, 1972

Species of lizard

Sceloporus exsul, the Queretaran desert lizard, is a species of lizard in the family Phrynosomatidae. It is endemic to Mexico.
