= Atlantasellus =

Scientific classification
- Kingdom: Animalia
- Phylum: Arthropoda
- Class: Malacostraca
- Order: Isopoda
- Suborder: Microcerberidea
- Family: Atlantasellidae; Sket, 1979
- Genus: Atlantasellus; Sket, 1979

Species
- Atlantasellus cavernicolus Sket, 1979; Atlantasellus dominicanus Jaume, 2001

Genus of crustaceans

Atlantasellus is a genus of crustaceans, and the only member of the family Atlantasellidae. It contains these species:

- Atlantasellus cavernicolus is endemic to Bermuda and is included on the IUCN Red List as Critically Endangered.
- Atlantasellus dominicanus was described in 2001, having been collected in coastal karsts in the Dominican Republic.
