= Hemidactylus kundaensis =

Conservation status
- Critically Endangered (IUCN 3.1)

Scientific classification
- Kingdom: Animalia
- Phylum: Chordata
- Class: Reptilia
- Order: Squamata
- Suborder: Gekkota
- Family: Gekkonidae
- Genus: Hemidactylus
- Species: H. kundaensis

Binomial name
- Hemidactylus kundaensis Chirio & Trape, 2012

Species of lizard

Hemidactylus kundaensis is a species of gecko. It is endemic to Guinea.
