= Peleliua pagodula =

Conservation status
- Critically Endangered (IUCN 3.1)

Scientific classification
- Kingdom: Animalia
- Phylum: Mollusca
- Class: Gastropoda
- Order: Stylommatophora
- Family: Trochomorphidae
- Genus: Peleliua
- Species: P. pagodula

Binomial name
- Peleliua pagodula (Semper, 1873)

Species of gastropod

Peleliua pagodula is a species of terrestrial pulmonate gastropod mollusk in the family Trochomorphidae.

This species is endemic to Palau.
