= Liolaemus aparicioi =

Conservation status
- Critically Endangered (IUCN 3.1)

Scientific classification
- Kingdom: Animalia
- Phylum: Chordata
- Class: Reptilia
- Order: Squamata
- Suborder: Iguania
- Family: Liolaemidae
- Genus: Liolaemus
- Species: L. aparicioi

Binomial name
- Liolaemus aparicioi Ocampo, Aguilar-Kirigin & Quinteros, 2012

Species of lizard

Liolaemus aparicioi is a species of lizard in the family Liolaemidae. The species is endemic to Bolivia.

== Etymology ==
The specific name, aparicioi, is in honor of Bolivian herpetologist James Aparicio Effen.

== Geographic range ==
L. aparicioi is found in western Bolivia, in La Paz Department.

== Habitat ==
The preferred natural habitat of L. aparicioi is dry forest, at altitudes of 3,000–3,900 m (9,800–12,800 ft).

== Description ==
Small for its genus, L. aparicio may attain a snout-to-vent length (SVL) of about 6 cm (2.4 in), with a tail length almost twice SVL.

== Behavior ==
L. aparicioi is terrestrial.

== Reproduction ==
The mode of reproduction of L. aparicioi is unknown.
