= Pristimantis kelephus =

Conservation status
- Critically Endangered (IUCN 3.1)

Scientific classification
- Kingdom: Animalia
- Phylum: Chordata
- Class: Amphibia
- Order: Anura
- Clade: Brachycephaloidea
- Family: Craugastoridae
- Genus: Pristimantis
- Species: P. kelephus

Binomial name
- Pristimantis kelephus (Lynch, 1998)

Synonyms
- Eleutherodactylus kelephus Lynch, 1998; Eleutherodactylus kelephas (incorrect spelling); Pristimantis kelephas

Species of frog

Pristimantis kelephus is a species of frog in the family Strabomantidae. It is endemic to Colombia and known from the Cordillera Occidental in Cauca, Chocó, and Valle del Cauca Departments, at elevations of 1,900–2,610 m (6,230–8,560 ft) asl. Its type locality is in El Cairo, Valle del Cauca Department. The specific name is derived from Greek kefephos, meaning leper, in reference to the rounded pustules on the dorsal surfaces that provide the impression of some disfigurement caused by leprosy.

== Description ==
Males measure 16–21 mm (0.63–0.83 in) and females 27–32 mm (1.1–1.3 in) in snout–vent length. Skin of dorsum has many round pustules, which form a H-shaped figure above scapulae as well as other ridges. Skin of venter is areolate. Dorsolateral folds are absent. Tympanum is prominent. Colouration is brown or maroon above (sometimes green) with darker markings. Venter is pale gold with heavy black markings to black or maroon with cream to white spotting. Iris is brown, sometimes brassy gold, with black reticulum.

== Habitat and conservation ==
Natural habitats of Pristimantis kelephus are primary and secondary cloud forests where it occurs on vegetation along small streams. It is a common frog, and no significant threats have been identified, but it is assessed as "Vulnerable" because it is only known from few locations.
