= Pristimantis xylochobates =

Conservation status
- Critically Endangered (IUCN 3.1)

Scientific classification
- Kingdom: Animalia
- Phylum: Chordata
- Class: Amphibia
- Order: Anura
- Clade: Brachycephaloidea
- Family: Craugastoridae
- Genus: Pristimantis
- Species: P. xylochobates

Binomial name
- Pristimantis xylochobates (Lynch & Ruíz-Carranza, 1996)

Synonyms
- Eleutherodactylus xylochobates Lynch & Ruíz-Carranza, 1996

Species of frog

Pristimantis xylochobates is a species of frog in the family Strabomantidae. It is endemic to Colombia. Its natural habitat is tropical moist montane forests. Like many species in the region, it is threatened by habitat loss.
