= Palaopartula calypso =

Great Palau tree snail

Conservation status
- Critically Endangered (IUCN 3.1)

Scientific classification
- Kingdom: Animalia
- Phylum: Mollusca
- Class: Gastropoda
- Order: Stylommatophora
- Family: Partulidae
- Genus: Palaopartula
- Species: P. calypso

Binomial name
- Palaopartula calypso Semper, 1865

Synonyms
- Partula calypso

Species of gastropod

Palaopartula calypso is a species of air-breathing tropical land snail, a terrestrial pulmonate gastropod mollusc in the family Partulidae. This species is endemic to Palau.
