= Enteromius boboi =

Conservation status
- Critically Endangered (IUCN 3.1)

Scientific classification
- Domain: Eukaryota
- Kingdom: Animalia
- Phylum: Chordata
- Class: Actinopterygii
- Order: Cypriniformes
- Family: Cyprinidae
- Subfamily: Smiliogastrinae
- Genus: Enteromius
- Species: E. boboi

Binomial name
- Enteromius boboi L. P. Schultz, 1942

Synonyms
- Barbus boboi Schultz, 1942

Species of fish

Enteromius boboi is a species of ray-finned fish in the genus Enteromius which is endemic to the River Farmington in the Gibi mountains of Liberia.

Named in honor of one of the local men who helped William M. Munn, the director of the National Zoological Park (Washington, D.C.), collect fishes in Liberia.
