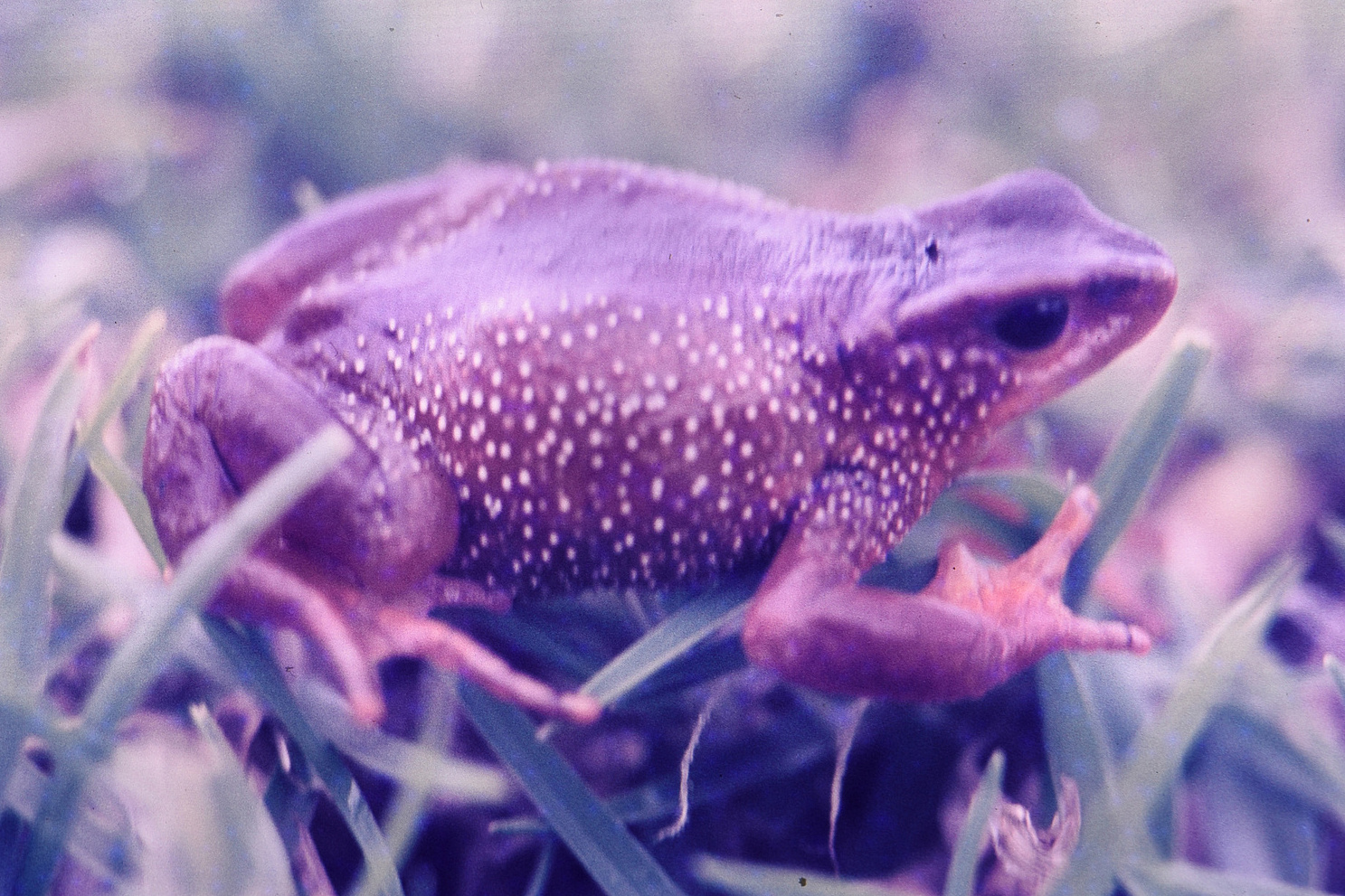

Conservation status
- Critically endangered, possibly extinct (IUCN 3.1)

Scientific classification
- Kingdom: Animalia
- Phylum: Chordata
- Class: Amphibia
- Order: Anura
- Family: Bufonidae
- Genus: Atelopus
- Species: A. guanujo

Binomial name
- Atelopus guanujo Coloma, 2002

= Guanujo stubfoot toad =

Species of amphibian

The Guanujo stubfoot toad (Atelopus guanujo), known in Spanish as puca sapo, is a possibly extinct species of toad in the family Bufonidae endemic to Ecuador. Its natural habitats are subtropical or tropical moist montane forests and rivers. It is threatened by habitat loss.

As with many other Atelopus species, it has been driven to near or total extinction due to chytridomycosis. In 2021, a potential wild male specimen was discovered, marking the first live observation of the species in nearly 33 years. However, this male appeared darker in color than previously known individuals, and there was speculation of it potentially being a hybrid between A. guanujo and A. ignescens. The male was kept in captivity at the Jambatu Center for Amphibian Research while searches for a female were conducted. A wild female was found, but due to poor cell reception delaying the message to the Center, it was released shortly afterwards. The male died in captivity shortly afterwards as well, although its sperm was preserved. Later eDNA studies indicated that A. guanujo may still persist in the environment at very low densities.
