= Bulimulus galapaganus =

Conservation status
- Critically Endangered (IUCN 3.1)

Scientific classification
- Kingdom: Animalia
- Phylum: Mollusca
- Class: Gastropoda
- Order: Stylommatophora
- Family: Bulimulidae
- Genus: Bulimulus
- Species: B. galapaganus

Binomial name
- Bulimulus galapaganus (Pfeiffer, 1854)

Species of gastropod

Bulimulus galapaganus is a species of tropical air-breathing land snail, a pulmonate gastropod mollusk in the subfamily Bulimulinae.

This species is endemic to Ecuador. It is threatened by habitat loss.

Bulimulus galapaganus is endemic to Floreana Island in the Galápagos Islands. It was not found alive over the past three years of collecting on Galápagos Islands. However, only one full week was spent collecting on Floreana Island, so the species' presence may have been overlooked. The range of suitable habitat for this species is likely to have declined because of human activities on this island (mostly because of farming). The area of habitat now available for this species is likely to be less than 100 km².
