= Alburnus nasreddini =

Conservation status
- Critically Endangered (IUCN 3.1)

Scientific classification
- Kingdom: Animalia
- Phylum: Chordata
- Class: Actinopterygii
- Order: Cypriniformes
- Family: Leuciscidae
- Subfamily: Leuciscinae
- Genus: Alburnus
- Species: A. nasreddini

Binomial name
- Alburnus nasreddini Battalgil, 1943

Species of fish

Alburnus nasreddini, also known as the Central Anatolian bleak or Eber bleak, is a species of ray-finned fish in the genus Alburnus, that is endemic to Turkey. It was previously found in Lake Eber and Lake Akşehir and their tributaries, but now is only found in one tributary of Lake Akşehir, the Ortaköy River. Massive amounts of water abstraction and heavy pollution has made most of its previous habitat uninhabitable for this species.
