= Paratilapia sp. nov. 'Vevembe' =

Conservation status
- Critically Endangered (IUCN 3.1)

Scientific classification
- Domain: Eukaryota
- Kingdom: Animalia
- Phylum: Chordata
- Class: Actinopterygii
- Order: Cichliformes
- Family: Cichlidae
- Subfamily: Paratilapiinae
- Genus: Paratilapia
- Species: P. sp. nov. 'Vevembe'

Binomial name
- Paratilapia sp. nov. 'Vevembe'

Species of fish

Paratilapia sp. nov. 'Vevembe' is a species of fish in the family Cichlidae. It is endemic to Madagascar. Its natural habitats are rivers and swamps. It is threatened by habitat loss.
