= Nemacheilus dori =

Conservation status
- Critically Endangered (IUCN 3.1)

Scientific classification
- Kingdom: Animalia
- Phylum: Chordata
- Class: Actinopterygii
- Order: Cypriniformes
- Family: Nemacheilidae
- Genus: Nemacheilus
- Species: N. dori

Binomial name
- Nemacheilus dori Banarescu, Nalbent & Goren, 1982

Species of fish

Nemacheilus dori (Palestine Loach) is a species of ray-finned fish in the family Balitoridae. It is found only in Israel. Its natural habitat is rivers. It is threatened by habitat loss.
