= Hemisaga elongata =

Conservation status
- Critically Endangered (IUCN 2.3)

Scientific classification
- Kingdom: Animalia
- Phylum: Arthropoda
- Class: Insecta
- Order: Orthoptera
- Suborder: Ensifera
- Family: Tettigoniidae
- Genus: Hemisaga
- Species: H. elongata

Binomial name
- Hemisaga elongata Rentz, 1993

Species of katydid

Hemisaga elongata is a species of insect in family Tettigoniidae. It is endemic to Australia.
