= Pyrgacris descampsi =

Scientific classification
- Kingdom: Animalia
- Phylum: Arthropoda
- Clade: Pancrustacea
- Class: Insecta
- Order: Orthoptera
- Suborder: Caelifera
- Family: Pyrgacrididae
- Genus: Pyrgacris
- Species: P. descampsi

Binomial name
- Pyrgacris descampsi Kevan, 1976

Species of grasshopper

Pyrgacris descampsi is a species of insect, belonging to the family Pyrgacrididae.

This species is known from La Réunion.
