= Tarphius rufonodulosus =

Conservation status
- Critically Endangered (IUCN 3.1)

Scientific classification
- Kingdom: Animalia
- Phylum: Arthropoda
- Class: Insecta
- Order: Coleoptera
- Suborder: Polyphaga
- Infraorder: Cucujiformia
- Family: Zopheridae
- Genus: Tarphius
- Species: T. rufonodulosus

Binomial name
- Tarphius rufonodulosus Israelson, 1984

Species of ironclad beetle

Tarphius rufonodulosus is a species of ironclad beetle endemic to the island of Santa Maria in the archipelago of the Azores, Portugal.
