= Austrodontura castletoni =

Conservation status
- Critically Endangered (IUCN 3.1)

Scientific classification
- Kingdom: Animalia
- Phylum: Arthropoda
- Class: Insecta
- Order: Orthoptera
- Suborder: Ensifera
- Family: Tettigoniidae
- Subfamily: Phaneropterinae
- Genus: Austrodontura
- Species: A. castletoni

Binomial name
- Austrodontura castletoni (Naskrecki & Bazelet, 2011

Species of insect

Austrodontura castletoni, known as Castleton's flightless katydid, is a species of katydid in the subfamily Phaneropterinae. It is named after the artist Gavin Castleton. The species is endemic to South Africa.
