= Eupithecia ogilviata =

Conservation status
- Extinct (IUCN 3.1)

Scientific classification
- Kingdom: Animalia
- Phylum: Arthropoda
- Clade: Pancrustacea
- Class: Insecta
- Order: Lepidoptera
- Family: Geometridae
- Genus: Eupithecia
- Species: †E. ogilviata

Binomial name
- †Eupithecia ogilviata (Warren, 1905)

Synonyms
- Tephroclystia ogilviata Warren, 1905

Species of moth

Eupithecia ogilviata is a recently extinct species of moth in the family Geometridae. It was once found in the Azores.
