= Sesato =

Conservation status
- Critically Endangered (IUCN 3.1)

Scientific classification
- Kingdom: Animalia
- Phylum: Arthropoda
- Subphylum: Chelicerata
- Class: Arachnida
- Order: Araneae
- Infraorder: Araneomorphae
- Family: Theridiidae
- Genus: Sesato; Saaristo, 2006
- Species: S. setosa

Binomial name
- Sesato setosa Saaristo, 2006

Monotypic genus of spiders

Sesato is a monotypic genus of African comb-footed spiders containing the single species, Sesato setosa. It was first described by Michael I. Saaristo in 2006, and is found on the Seychelles.
