= N. minuta =

N. minuta may refer to:

- Naticopsis minuta, an extinct sea snail species in the genus Naticopsis and the family Neritopsidae
- Neohoratia minuta, a very small freshwater snail species endemic to Switzerland
- Nepotilla minuta, a sea snail species

== See also ==
- Minuta
