= Horatia =

Horatia may refer to:

- The Roman gens Horatia, and female members of that gens
- One of the thirty-five Servian tribes of ancient Rome
- Horatia (gastropod), a genus of freshwater and brackish water snails in the family Hydrobiidae
- Horatia (given name)
