= Ohridohauffenia minuta =

Conservation status
- Critically Endangered (IUCN 3.1)

Scientific classification
- Domain: Eukaryota
- Kingdom: Animalia
- Phylum: Mollusca
- Class: Gastropoda
- Subclass: Caenogastropoda
- Order: Littorinimorpha
- Family: Hydrobiidae
- Genus: Ohridohauffenia
- Species: O. minuta

Binomial name
- Ohridohauffenia minuta Radoman, 1955

Species of gastropod

Ohridohauffenia minuta is a species of small freshwater hydrobiid gastropod, endemic to springs near Lake Ohrid. The species was originally found in the springs of Studenicista (Bej Bunar) in North Macedonia. Road construction extirpated the only known population, as surveys in 2009 failed to find the species in this site which is also the type locality. The endemic springs were of freshwater, and had stony bottoms with a constant temperature of 11 °C.
