= Sculpin snail =

Conservation status
- Vulnerable (IUCN 3.1)

- Critically Imperiled (NatureServe)

Scientific classification
- Kingdom: Animalia
- Phylum: Mollusca
- Class: Gastropoda
- Subclass: Caenogastropoda
- Order: Littorinimorpha
- Family: Hydrobiidae
- Genus: Stiobia
- Species: S. nana

Binomial name
- Stiobia nana F. G. Thompson, 1978

Species of gastropod

The sculpin snail, scientific name Stiobia nana, is a species of small freshwater snail with an operculum, an aquatic gastropod mollusk in the family Hydrobiidae. This species is endemic to the United States.
