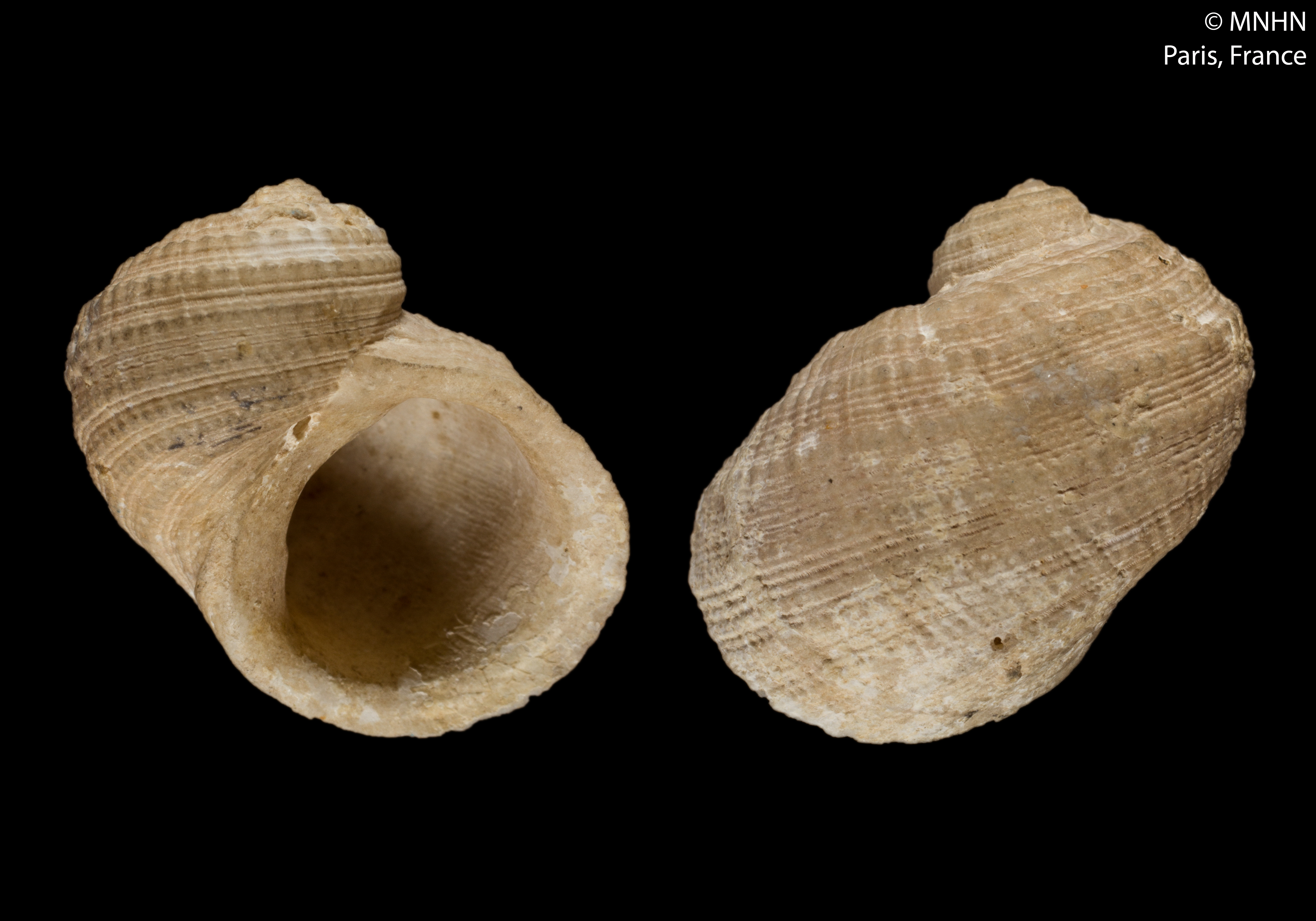
- Shell of Neritopsis interlirata (holotype at MNHN, Paris)

Scientific classification
- Kingdom: Animalia
- Phylum: Mollusca
- Class: Gastropoda
- Order: Cycloneritida
- Family: Neritopsidae
- Genus: Neritopsis
- Species: N. interlirata

Binomial name
- Neritopsis interlirata Pease, 1868

Synonyms
- Neritopsis richeri Lozouet, 2009

= Neritopsis interlirata =

Species of gastropod

Neritopsis interlirata is a species of sea snail, a marine gastropod mollusc in the family Neritopsidae.

The specific name richeri in the synonym is in honor of researcher Dr. Bertrand Richer de Forges .

== Distribution ==
The type locality is Rurutu (Avera), Austral Islands, French Polynesia and off the Tuamotu Islands.
