= Fissuria boui =

Conservation status
- Near Threatened (IUCN 3.1)

Scientific classification
- Kingdom: Animalia
- Phylum: Mollusca
- Class: Gastropoda
- Subclass: Caenogastropoda
- Order: Littorinimorpha
- Family: Hydrobiidae
- Genus: Fissuria
- Species: F. boui

Binomial name
- Fissuria boui Boeters, 1981

Synonyms
- Fissuria bovi Boeters, 1981

Species of gastropod

Fissuria boui is a species of small freshwater snails with a gill and an operculum, aquatic gastropod molluscs in the family Hydrobiidae. This species is endemic to France.
