= Pontobelgrandiella bachkovoensis =

Conservation status
- Critically Endangered (IUCN 3.1)

Scientific classification
- Kingdom: Animalia
- Phylum: Mollusca
- Class: Gastropoda
- Subclass: Caenogastropoda
- Order: Littorinimorpha
- Family: Hydrobiidae
- Genus: Pontobelgrandiella
- Species: P. bachkovoensis

Binomial name
- Pontobelgrandiella bachkovoensis (Glöer & Georgiev, 2009)

Synonyms
- Belgrandiella bachkovoensis Glöer & Georgiev, 2009

Species of gastropod

Pontobelgrandiella bachkovoensis is a species of minute freshwater snail with a gill and an operculum, an aquatic gastropod mollusk in the family Hydrobiidae.

== Distribution ==
The species is endemic to Bulgaria. It has a very restricted distribution in a small stream (approx. 200m in length) in the Western Rhodopes, near the Bedechka River.
