= Pontobelgrandiella bureschi =

Scientific classification
- Kingdom: Animalia
- Phylum: Mollusca
- Class: Gastropoda
- Subclass: Caenogastropoda
- Order: Littorinimorpha
- Family: Hydrobiidae
- Genus: Pontobelgrandiella
- Species: P. bureschi

Binomial name
- Pontobelgrandiella bureschi (Angelov, 1976)

Synonyms
- Belgrandiella bureschi Angelov, 1976

Species of gastropod

Pontobelgrandiella bureschi is a species of gastropod belonging to the family Hydrobiidae.

The species is found in Bulgaria. The species inhabits freshwater environments. It is named after Bulgarian zoologist Ivan Buresh.
