= Mercuria (disambiguation) =

Mercuria may refer to:

- Latin name for Herma
- Mercuria Energy Trading
- Mercuria (gastropod), a genus of gastropods in the family Hydrobiidae
