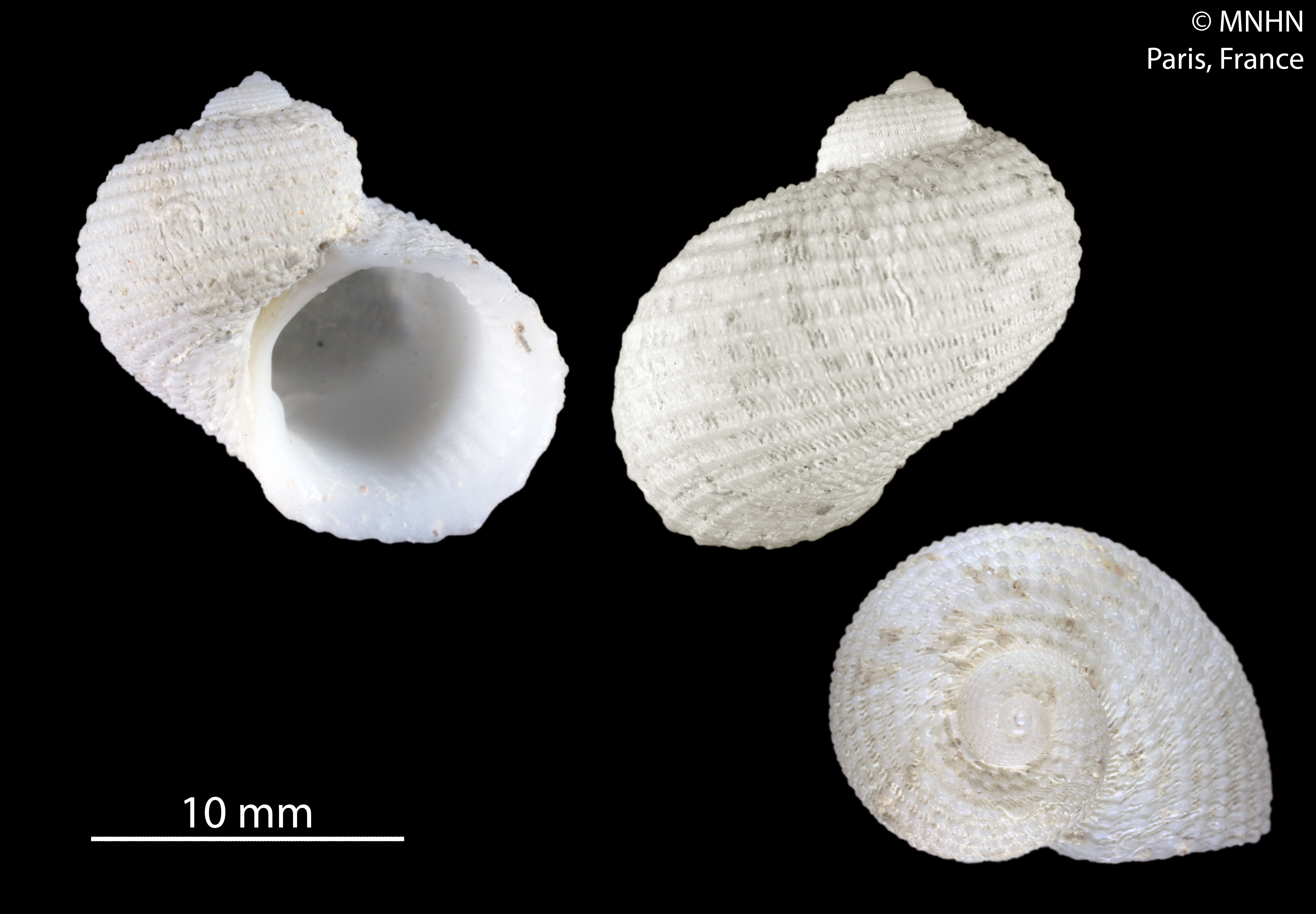
- Shell of Neritopsis atlantica (paratype at MNHN? Paris)

Scientific classification
- Kingdom: Animalia
- Phylum: Mollusca
- Class: Gastropoda
- Order: Cycloneritida
- Family: Neritopsidae
- Genus: Neritopsis
- Species: N. atlantica

Binomial name
- Neritopsis atlantica Sarasúa, 1973

Synonyms
- Neritopsis finlayi R. C. Hoerle, 1974

= Neritopsis atlantica =

Species of gastropod

Neritopsis atlantica is a species of sea snail, a marine gastropod mollusc in the family Neritopsidae.

== Distribution ==
This marine species occurs off Cuba.
