= Ohridohauffenia drimica =

Conservation status
- Extinct (yes) (IUCN 3.1)

Scientific classification
- Kingdom: Animalia
- Phylum: Mollusca
- Class: Gastropoda
- Subclass: Caenogastropoda
- Order: Littorinimorpha
- Family: Hydrobiidae
- Genus: Ohridohauffenia
- Species: †O. drimica

Binomial name
- †Ohridohauffenia drimica (Radoman, 1964)

Species of gastropod

Ohridohauffenia drimica was a species of very small freshwater snail with an operculum, an aquatic gastropod mollusk in the family Hydrobiidae, the river snails. This species is now extinct.

== Distribution & Extinction ==
This river snail was endemic to sediments within springs feeding the Drim River in North Macedonia, Europe. It was last seen in 1983, after which surveys failed to find this species in its original habitat when the Drim was drained of much of its water.
