= Falniowskia neglectissima =

Conservation status
- Data Deficient (IUCN 3.1)

Scientific classification
- Kingdom: Animalia
- Phylum: Mollusca
- Class: Gastropoda
- Subclass: Caenogastropoda
- Order: Littorinimorpha
- Family: Hydrobiidae
- Genus: Falniowskia
- Species: F. neglectissima

Binomial name
- Falniowskia neglectissima (Falniowski & Steffek, 1989)

Species of gastropod

Falniowskia neglectissima is a species of freshwater snail with an operculum, an aquatic gastropod mollusk in the family Hydrobiidae, the snouted freshwater snails.

== Distribution ==
F. neglectissima occurs in Southern Poland and Ukraine.

== Habitat ==
F. neglectissima inhabits freshwater springs.

== Conservation status ==
F. neglectissima was originally assessed as Near Threatened (LR/nt) for the 1996 IUCN Red List, as it is restricted to springs in a small geographical area. However, individuals have not been found since 1988 and it is currently considered data deficient; it is listed as critically endangered in the Polish Red Data Book of Animals.
