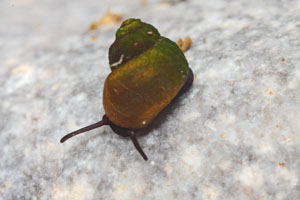

Conservation status
- Least Concern (IUCN 3.1)

Scientific classification
- Kingdom: Animalia
- Phylum: Mollusca
- Class: Gastropoda
- Subclass: Caenogastropoda
- Order: Littorinimorpha
- Family: Hydrobiidae
- Genus: Sadleriana
- Species: S. fluminensis

Binomial name
- Sadleriana fluminensis (Küster, 1853)

Synonyms
- Lithoglyphus fluminensis (Küster, 1853); Lithoglyphus licanus A.J. Wagner, 1912 (junior synonym); Paludina fluminensis Küster, 1853 (original combination)

= Sadleriana fluminensis =

Species of gastropod

Sadleriana fluminensis is a freshwater snail from the family Hydrobiidae.

== Range ==
Sadleriana fluminensis occurs in northern Italy, Slovenia, Croatia and Bosnia-Herzegovina. The now scattered occurrences can be interpreted as relics of a contiguous distribution during the last Ice Age, when the Adriatic Sea was partially dried up and the rivers had common lower reaches.
