= Grossuana thracica =

Conservation status
- Critically Endangered (IUCN 3.1)

Scientific classification
- Kingdom: Animalia
- Phylum: Mollusca
- Class: Gastropoda
- Subclass: Caenogastropoda
- Order: Littorinimorpha
- Family: Hydrobiidae
- Genus: Grossuana
- Species: G. thracica

Binomial name
- Grossuana thracica (Glöer & Georgiev, 2009)

Species of gastropod

Grossuana thracica is a species of very small freshwater snail, an aquatic gastropod mollusc in the family Hydrobiidae.

== Distribution ==
This species is endemic to Bulgaria, where it is found at one site only. This site is the area where water emerges from the spring in Chirpan Bunar Cave, and flows into a small pond. The total area occupied by this species of snail is approximately 2 m of the spring's flow length. The cave is situated 3 km east of the village of Bolyarino, in the Upper Thracian Lowland.
