= Neritopsis aqabaensis =

Scientific classification
- Kingdom: Animalia
- Phylum: Mollusca
- Class: Gastropoda
- Order: Cycloneritida
- Family: Neritopsidae
- Genus: Neritopsis
- Species: N. aqabaensis

Binomial name
- Neritopsis aqabaensis Bandel, 2007

Species of gastropod

Neritopsis aqabaensis is a species of sea snail, a marine gastropod mollusc in the family Neritopsidae.

== Description ==
The veliger is planktotrophic.

== Distribution ==
This species occurs in the Gulf of Aqaba, Jordan.
