= Corrosella astierii =

Conservation status
- Vulnerable (IUCN 2.3)

Scientific classification
- Kingdom: Animalia
- Phylum: Mollusca
- Class: Gastropoda
- Subclass: Caenogastropoda
- Order: Littorinimorpha
- Family: Hydrobiidae
- Genus: Corrosella
- Species: C. astierii

Binomial name
- Corrosella astierii (Dupuy, 1851)

Synonyms
- Bythinella anteisensis Bérenguier, 1882; Bythinella berenguieri Bourguignat in Bérenguier, 1882; Bythinella doumeti Bourguignat in Locard, 1893; Corrosella anteisensis (Bérenguier, 1882); Hydrobia astierii Dupuy, 1851 (original combination); Pseudamnicola (Corrosella) astierii (Dupuy, 1851); Pseudamnicola anteisensis Bérenguier, 1882; Pseudamnicola astierii (Dupuy, 1851)

Species of gastropod

Corrosella astierii is a species of small brackish water snails with an operculum, aquatic gastropod mollusks in the family Hydrobiidae.

This species is endemic to France.
