= Corrosella =

Scientific classification
- Kingdom: Animalia
- Phylum: Mollusca
- Class: Gastropoda
- Subclass: Caenogastropoda
- Order: Littorinimorpha
- Superfamily: Truncatelloidea
- Family: Hydrobiidae
- Subfamily: Pseudamnicolinae
- Genus: Corrosella; Boeters, 1970

Type species
- Corrosella falkneri Boeters, 1970

Synonyms
- Pseudamnicola (Corrosella) Boeters, 1970; Pseudoamnicola (Corrosella) Boeters, 1970 (new combination)

Genus of gastropods

Corrosella is a genus of minute freshwater snails with an operculum, aquatic gastropod molluscs or micromolluscs in the subfamily Pseudamnicolinae of the family Hydrobiidae.

== Species ==
- Corrosella andalusica (Delicado, Machordom & Ramos, 2012)
- Corrosella astierii (Dupuy, 1851)
- Corrosella atlasensis Boulaassafer, Ghamizi & Delicado, 2021
- Corrosella bareai (Delicado, Machordom & Ramos, 2012)
- Corrosella collingi (Boeters, Girardi & Knebelsberger, 2015)
- Corrosella falkneri Boeters, 1970
- Corrosella herreroi (Bech, 1993)
- Corrosella hinzi (Boeters, 1986)
- Corrosella hydrobiopsis (Boeters, 1999)
- Corrosella iruritai (Delicado, Machordom & Ramos, 2012)
- Corrosella luisi (Boeters, 1984)
- Corrosella mahouchii Boulaassafer, Ghamizi & Delicado, 2021
- Corrosella manueli (Delicado, Machordom & Ramos, 2012)
- Corrosella marisolae (Delicado, Machordom & Ramos, 2012)
- Corrosella marocana (Pallary, 1922)
- Corrosella navasiana (Fagot, 1907)
- Corrosella nechadae Boulaassafer, Ghamizi & Delicado, 2021
- Corrosella pallaryi (Ghamizi, Vala & Bouka, 1997)
- Corrosella segoviana (Talaván Serna & Talaván Gómez, 2019)
- Corrosella tajoensis (Boeters, Girardi & Knebelsberger, 2015)
- Corrosella tejedoi (Boeters, Girardi & Knebelsberger, 2015)
- Corrosella valladolensis (Boeters, Girardi & Knebelsberger, 2015)
- Corrosella wakrimi Boulaassafer, Ghamizi & Delicado, 2021

Synonyms

- Corrosella anteisensis (Bérenguier, 1882): synonym of Corrosella astierii (Dupuy, 1851)
- Corrosella hauffei (Delicado & Ramos, 2012): synonym of Corrosella herreroi (Bech, 1993)
