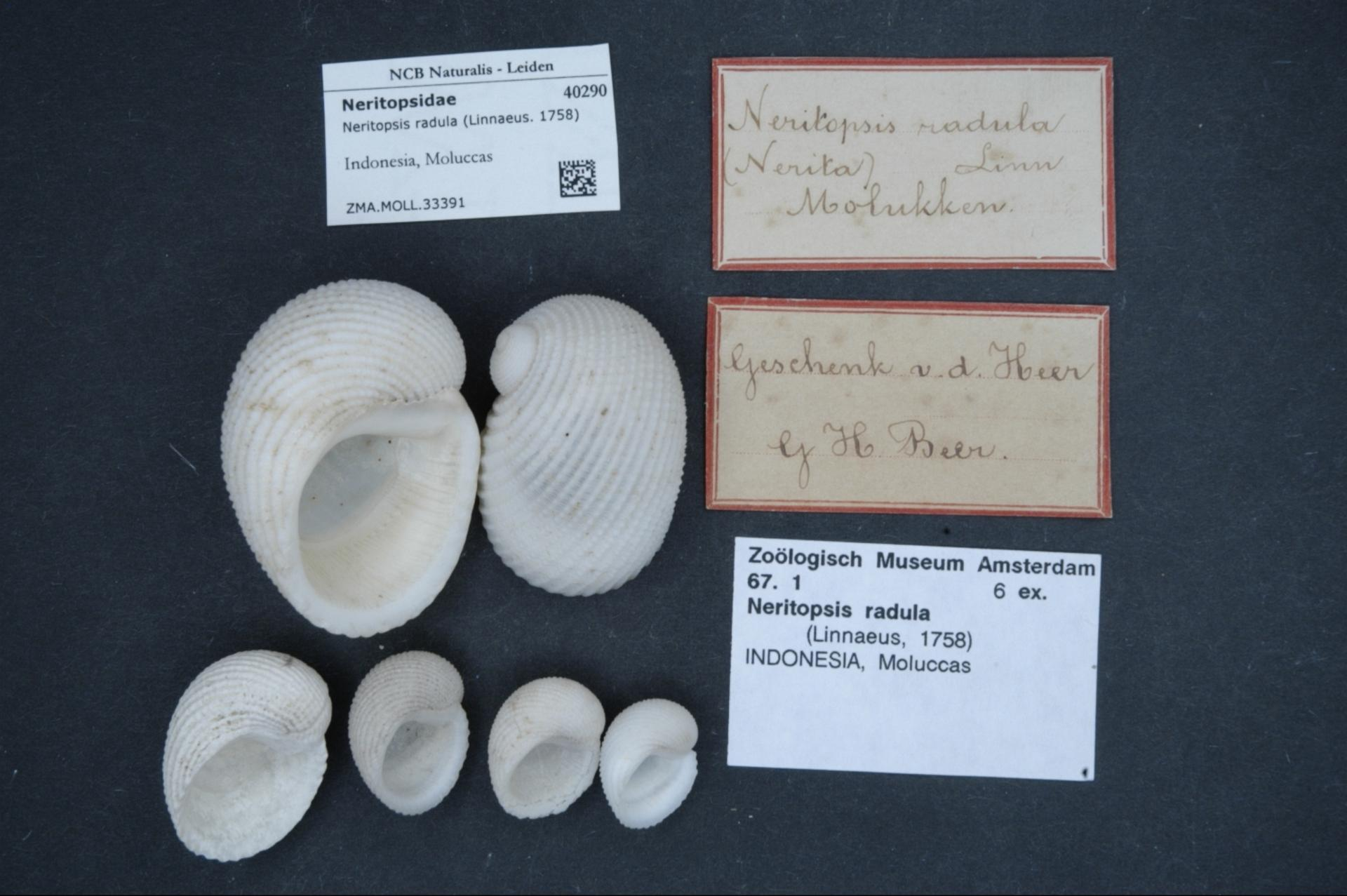
- Neritopsis radula shells

Scientific classification
- Kingdom: Animalia
- Phylum: Mollusca
- Class: Gastropoda
- Order: Cycloneritida
- Superfamily: Neritopsoidea
- Family: Neritopsidae
- Subfamily: Neritopsinae
- Genus: Neritopsis; Grateloup, 1832

Type species
- † Neritopsis moniliformis Grateloup, 1832

Synonyms
- † Neritopsis (Neritopsis) Grateloup, 1832 · accepted, alternate representation

= Neritopsis =

Neritopsis Temporal range: Jurassic–Recent (Triassic?) Jurassic - Recent

Genus of gastropods

Neritopsis is a genus of sea snails in the subfamily Neritopsinae of the family Neritopsidae.

== Species ==
Species within the genus Neritopsis include:

- † Neritopsis acutispira A.E.M. Cossmann, 1886
- Neritopsis aqabaensis Bandel, 2007
- Neritopsis atlantica Sarasúa, 1973
- † Neritopsis auerbachii (Trautschold, 1858)
- † Neritopsis benacensis Vacek, 1886
- Neritopsis benoisti A.E.M. Cossmann, 1899
- † Neritopsis bernayi A.E.M. Cossmann, 1887
- † Neritopsis bicarinata E.A.L. Kittl, 1894
- † Neritopsis brasili Symonds, Gain & Le Renard, 2020
- † Neritopsis cancellatus Moore
- † Neritopsis carmenae Pacaud & Quaggiotto, 2011
- † Neritopsis dumortieri L.F. Conti & Szabó, 1989
- † Neritopsis elegantissima Hornes, 1853
- † Neritopsis fabianii Toni, 1912
- † Neritopsis faizae Abbass, 1972
- † Neritopsis galeola Stoppani, 1858
- † Neritopsis gedrosiana Harzhauser, 2017
- † Neritopsis glabrata E.A.L. Kittl, 1894
- † Neritopsis granulata G. B. Sowerby I, 1834
- † Neritopsis incisa Hudleston
- Neritopsis interlirata Pease, 1868
- † Neritopsis kasei S. Kiel & K. Bandel, 2004
- † Neritopsis kotelnikensis Gerasimov, 1992
- † Neritopsis moniliformis Grateloup, 1832 - type species, from Lower Miocene
- † Neritopsis opalina Brusamien, 1909
- † Neritopsis papodensis J. Szabo, 1982
- † Neritopsis parisiensis Deshayes, 1864 - from Eocene
- † Neritopsis philea A.V.M.D. D'Orbigny, 1851
- † Neritopsis planoplicatus Tong & Erwin, 2001
- † Neritopsis praeclara Seguenza, 1885
- † Neritopsis pulcella Pacaud & Quaggiotto, 2011
- Neritopsis radula (Linnaeus, 1758)
- Neritopsis spinigera J. Szabo, 1982
- † Neritopsis toddi Symonds, Gain & Le Renard, 2020
- † Neritopsis varicosa Morris & J. Lycett
- † Neritopsis vokesorum R.C. Hoerle, 1972

Species brought into synonymy

- † Neritopsis altavillensis Deshayes, 1857 : synonym of † Neritopsis granulata G. B. Sowerby I, 1834
- † Neritopsis defrancii Vieillard & Dollfus, 1875 †: synonym of † Neritopsis granulata G. B. Sowerby I, 1834
- Neritopsis finlayi Hoerle, 1974: synonym of Neritopsis atlantica Sarasúa, 1973
- † Neritopsis guerangeri Davoust, 1856 †: synonym of † Naricopsina guerangeri (Davoust, 1856) (new combination)
- Neritopsis richeri Lozouet, 2009: synonym of Neritopsis interlirata Pease, 1868
- † Neritopsis semiplicata Issel, 1869 †: synonym of † Vanikoro semiplicata (Issel, 1869) (original combination)
