= Hoyia =

Scientific classification
- Kingdom: Animalia
- Phylum: Mollusca
- Class: Gastropoda
- Subclass: Caenogastropoda
- Order: Littorinimorpha
- Family: Hydrobiidae
- Genus: Hoyia; F. C. Baker, 1926

Type species
- Amnicola sheldoni Pilsbry, 1890

Genus of snails

Hoyia is a genus of molluscs in the family Hydrobiidae.

== Species ==
- Hoyia sheldoni (Pilsbry, 1890)
