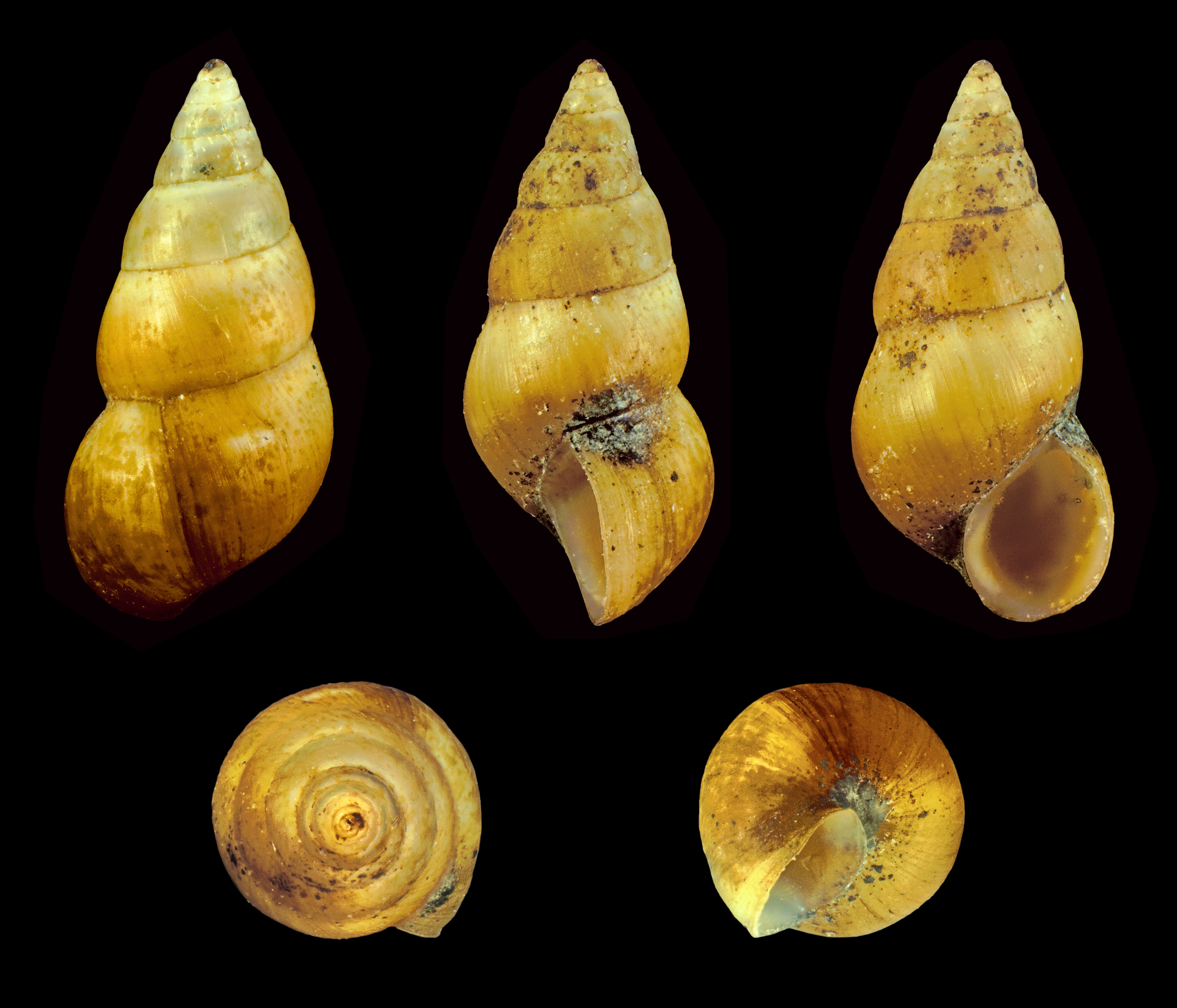
- Peringia ulvae

Scientific classification
- Domain: Eukaryota
- Kingdom: Animalia
- Phylum: Mollusca
- Class: Gastropoda
- Subclass: Caenogastropoda
- Order: Littorinimorpha
- Family: Hydrobiidae
- Subfamily: Hydrobiinae
- Genus: Peringia; Paladilhe, 1874

= Peringia =

Genus of gastropods

Peringia is a genus of very small snails with gills and an operculum, gastropod mollusks in the family Hydrobiidae.

This genus has become a synonym for Hydrobia Hartmann, 1821.

These snails live in intermediate habitats at high tide level, on mud, in protected estuarine and coastal areas. Because of this habitat these snails are sometimes categorized as marine, sometimes as aquatic in general, and sometimes are included in lists of land snails.

== Species within the genus Peringia ==
- † Peringia benoisti (Dollfus & Dautzenberg, 1886)
- † Peringia conoidea (von Koenen, 1883)
- Peringia depressa
- † Peringia fontannesi (Dollfus & Dautzenberg, 1886)
- † Peringia gottscheana (von Koenen, 1883)
- Peringia mabellil
- Peringia obeliscus
- Peringia ulvae (Pennant, 1777)

Species brought into synonymy

- Peringia castroi Locard, 1899: synonym of Peringia ulvae (Pennant, 1777)
- Peringia cyclolabris Bourguignat, 1876: synonym of Peringia ulvae (Pennant, 1777)
- Peringia lusitanica Locard, 1899: synonym of Peringia ulvae (Pennant, 1777)
- Peringia minoricensis Paladilhe, 1875: synonym of Hydrobia acuta acuta (Draparnaud, 1805)
- Peringia paulinoi Locard, 1899: synonym of Peringia ulvae (Pennant, 1777)
