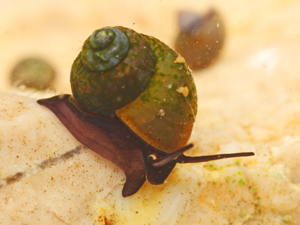
- Sadleriana bavarica

Scientific classification
- Kingdom: Animalia
- Phylum: Mollusca
- Class: Gastropoda
- Subclass: Caenogastropoda
- Order: Littorinimorpha
- Family: Hydrobiidae
- Genus: Sadleriana; Clessin, 1890

= Sadleriana =

Genus of gastropods

Sadleriana is a genus of small freshwater snails, aquatic gastropod mollusks in the family Hydrobiidae.

== Species ==
Species within the genus Sadleriana include:

- Sadleriana bavarica Boeters, 1989
- Sadleriana bulgarica (A. J. Wagner, 1928)
- Sadleriana byzanthina (Küster, 1852)
- Sadleriana cavernosa Radoman, 1978
- Sadleriana fluminensis (Kuster, 1853)
- Sadleriana sadleriana (Frauenfeld, 1863)
  - Sadleriana sadleriana sadleriana (Frauenfeld, 1863)
  - Sadleriana sadleriana robici (Clessin, 1890)
- Sadleriana schmidtii (Menke, 1849)
- Sadleriana supercarinata (Schutt, 1969)

Species brought into synonymy:

- Sadleriana pannonica (Frauenfeld, 1865) is a synonym of Bythinella pannonica (Frauenfeld, 1865).

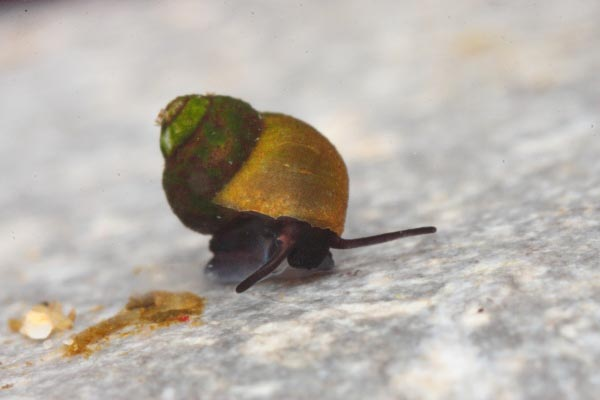
Sadleriana fluminensis

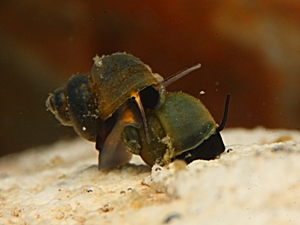
Sadleriana schmidtii
