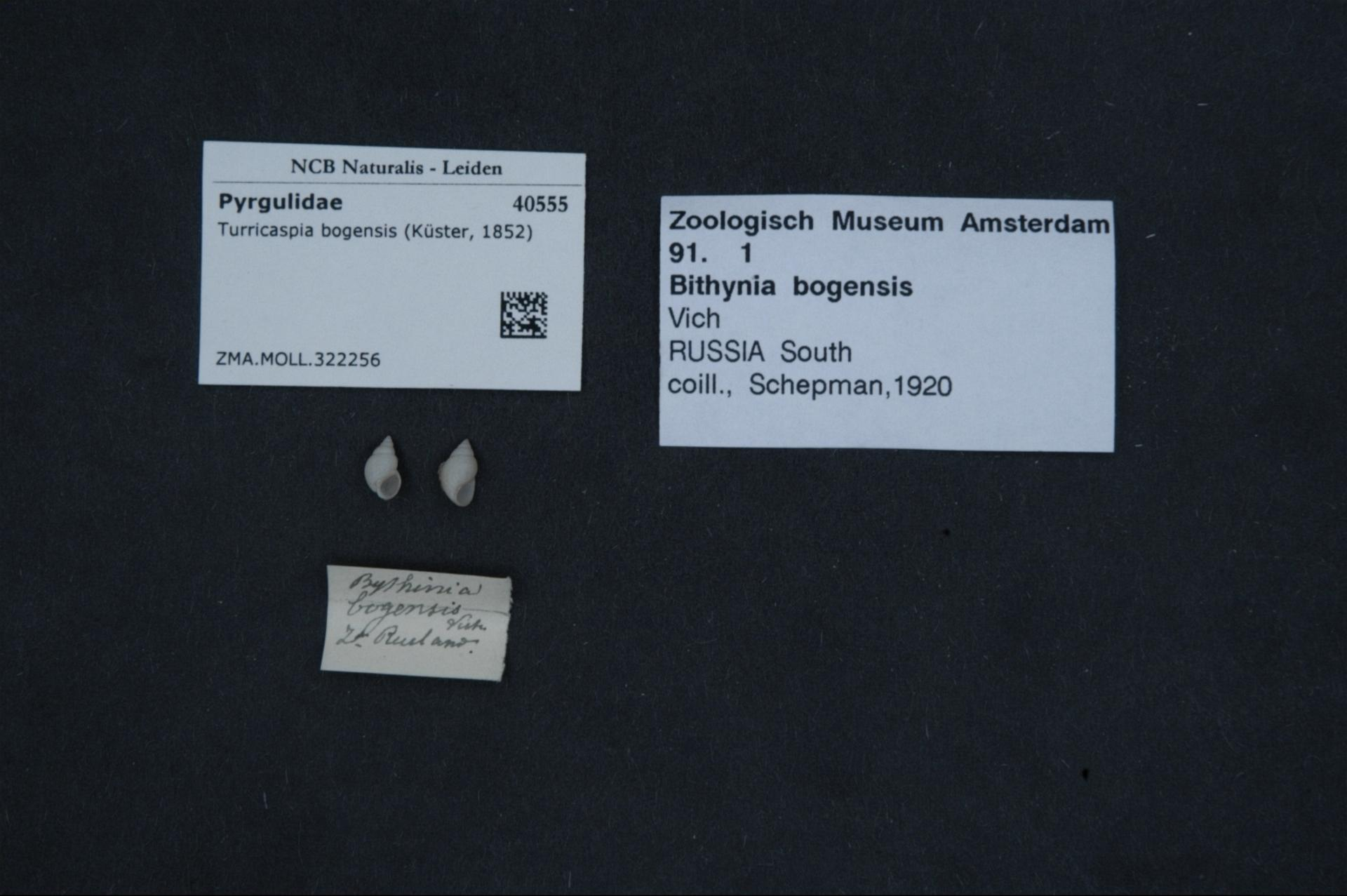
- Turricaspia

Scientific classification
- Kingdom: Animalia
- Phylum: Mollusca
- Class: Gastropoda
- Subclass: Caenogastropoda
- Order: Littorinimorpha
- Family: Hydrobiidae
- Genus: Turricaspia; B. Dybowski & Grochmalicki, 1915

= Turricaspia =

Genus of gastropods

Turricaspia is a genus of aquatic snails which includes marine snails, brackish water snails and freshwater snails which all have a gill and an operculum, aquatic gastropod mollusks in the family Hydrobiidae. Turricaspia is the type genus of the Turricaspiinae, which is a synonym of Pyrgulinae.

== Species ==
Species within the genus Turricaspia include:

- Turricaspia andrussowi (B. Dybowski & Grochmalicki, 1915) - marine
- Turricaspia astrachanica (Pirogov, 1971) - freshwater
- Turricaspia bogatscheviana (Logvinenko & Starobogatov, 1968) - marine
- Turricaspia bogensis (Dubois in Küster, 1852) - brackish and marine
- Turricaspia boltovskoji (Golikov & Starobogatov, 1966) - brackish
- Turricaspia borceana (Golikov & Starobogatov, 1966) - marine
- Turricaspia caspia (Eichwald, 1838) - marine
- Turricaspia chersonica Alexenko & Starobogatov, 1987 - freshwater
- Turricaspia conus (Eichwald, 1838)
  - Turricaspia conus conus (Eichwald, 1838) - marine
  - Turricaspia conus lindholmiana (Golikov et Starobogatov, 1966) - marine and brackish
- Turricaspia crimeana (Golikov & Starobogatov, 1966) - marine
- Turricaspia dagestanica (Logvinenko & Starobogatov, 1968) - marine
- Turricaspia derbentina (Logvinenko & Starobogatov, 1968) - marine
- Turricaspia eburnea (Logvinenko & Starobogatov, 1968) - marine
- Turricaspia elegantula (Clessin & W. Dybowski in W. Dybowski, 1888) - marine
- Turricaspia iljinae (Golikov & Starobogatov, 1966) - marine
- Turricaspia ismailensis (Golikov & Starobogatov, 1966) - freshwater
- Turricaspia lirata (B. Dybowski & J. Grochmalicki, 1915)
  - Turricaspia lirata marisnigri Starobogatov in Alexenko et Starobogatov, 1987 - marine
- Turricaspia martensii (Clessin & W. Dybowski in W. Dybowski, 1888) - freshwater and brackish
- Turricaspia meneghiniana (Issel, 1865) - marine
- Turricaspia nevesskae (Golikov & Starobogatov, 1966) - marine
- Turricaspia ovum Logvinenko & Starobogatov, 1968 - marine
- Turricaspia pullula (B. Dybowski & Grochmalicki, 1915) - marine
- Turricaspia sajenkovae (Logvinenko & Starobogatov, 1968) - marine and brackish
- Turricaspia spasskii (Logvinenko & Starobogatov, 1968) - marine
- Turricaspia spica (Eichwald, 1855) - marine and brackish
- Turricaspia triton (Eichwald, 1838) - marine and brackish
- Turricaspia trivialis (Logvinenko & Starobogatov, 1968) - marine
- Turricaspia turricula (Clessin et W. Dybowski in W. Dybowski, 1888) - type species, marine
- Turricaspia variabilis (Eichwald, 1838) - brackish and freshwater
- Turricaspia vinogradovi (Logvinenko & Starobogatov, 1968) - marine and brackish
