= Horatia (given name) =

The female form of the name Horatio. Persons with this name include

- Horatia Nelson (1801–1881), daughter of Horatio Nelson
- Florence Horatia Nelson Suckling (1848–1923), English activist and writer
- Juliana Horatia Ewing (1842–1885), children's author, daughter of J. Ewing
- Anna Horatia Waldegrave, daughter of James Waldegrave, 2nd Earl Waldegrave, wife of Francis Seymour-Conway, 1st Marquess of Hertford, and mother of George Francis Seymour
- the Hon. Horatia Stopford, one of Queen Victoria's maids of honour, painted by James Jebusa Shannon
- Horatia Isabella Harriet Morler, wife of Algernon St Maur, 14th Duke of Somerset, making her Duchess of Somerset
- Hilda Horatia Barlow, daughter of Sir Alan Barlow, 2nd Bt, mother of Ruth Padel
- Horatia Winwood, character in The Convenient Marriage
- Horatia Lawson, sister of Nigella Lawson
- Horatia Hughes, daughter of Garreth Hughes

== See also ==
- Horatia (disambiguation)
