= Laevicaspia =

Scientific classification
- Domain: Eukaryota
- Kingdom: Animalia
- Phylum: Mollusca
- Class: Gastropoda
- Subclass: Caenogastropoda
- Order: Littorinimorpha
- Family: Hydrobiidae
- Subfamily: Pyrgulinae
- Genus: Laevicaspia; Dybowski & Grochmalicki, 1917

Genus of snails

Laevicaspia is a genus of gastropods belonging to the family Hydrobiidae.

The species of this genus are found in near Black Sea and Caspian Sea.

Species:

- Laevicaspia abichi (Logvinenko & Starobogatov, 1969)
- Laevicaspia caspia (Eichwald, 1838)
- Laevicaspia cincta (Abich, 1859)
- Laevicaspia conus (Eichwald, 1838)
- Laevicaspia derzhavini (Logvinenko & Starobogatov, 1969)
- Laevicaspia ebersini (Logvinenko & Starobogatov, 1969)
- Laevicaspia ismailensis (Golikov & Starobogatov, 1966)
- Laevicaspia kolesnikoviana (Logvinenko & Starobogatov, 1966)
- Laevicaspia kowalewskii (Clessin & W.Dybowski, 1887)
- Laevicaspia lencoranica (Logvinenko & Starobogatov, 1969)
- Laevicaspia lincta (Milaschewitsch, 1908)
- Laevicaspia malandzii Anistratenko & Gozhik, 1995
- Laevicaspia marginata (Westerlund, 1902)
- Laevicaspia obventicia (Anistratenko, 1992)
- Laevicaspia pseudoazovica Anistratenko & Gozhik, 1995
- Laevicaspia raffii Anistratenko, 1995
- Laevicaspia seninskii Anistratenko & Gozhik, 1995
- Laevicaspia sieversii (Clessin, 1887)
- Laevicaspia sobrievskii (Rosen, 1914)
- Laevicaspia subeichwaldi Anistratenko & Gozhik, 1995
- Laevicaspia vinarskii Neubauer, van de Velde, Yanina & Wesseling, 2018
