= Birgella =

Scientific classification
- Kingdom: Animalia
- Phylum: Mollusca
- Class: Gastropoda
- Subclass: Caenogastropoda
- Order: Littorinimorpha
- Family: Hydrobiidae
- Subfamily: Nymphophilinae
- Genus: Birgella; Baker, 1926

Genus of snails

Birgella is a genus of gastropods belonging to the family Hydrobiidae.

The species of this genus are found in Northern America.

Species:

- Birgella burchi Naranjo-García & Aguillón, 2019
- Birgella subglobosa (Say, 1825) (synonym: Birgella subglobosus)
