= Fissuria =

Scientific classification
- Kingdom: Animalia
- Phylum: Mollusca
- Class: Gastropoda
- Subclass: Caenogastropoda
- Order: Littorinimorpha
- Family: Hydrobiidae
- Subfamily: Islamiinae
- Genus: Fissuria; Boeters, 1981

Genus of gastropods

Fissuria is a genus of minute freshwater snails with an operculum, aquatic gastropod molluscs or micromolluscs in the family Hydrobiidae.

== Species ==
Species within the genus Fissuria include:

- Fissuria bovi Boeters, 1981
