= Pluviostilla =

Scientific classification
- Kingdom: Animalia
- Phylum: Mollusca
- Class: Gastropoda
- Order: Cycloneritida
- Family: Neritopsidae
- Genus: Pluviostilla; Kase & Kano, 1999
- Species: P. palauensis

Binomial name
- Pluviostilla palauensis Kase & Kano, 1999

Genus of gastropods

Pluviostilla is a monospecific genus of sea snails, marine gastropod mollusks in the family Neritopsidae. The sole species is Pluviostilla palauensis.
