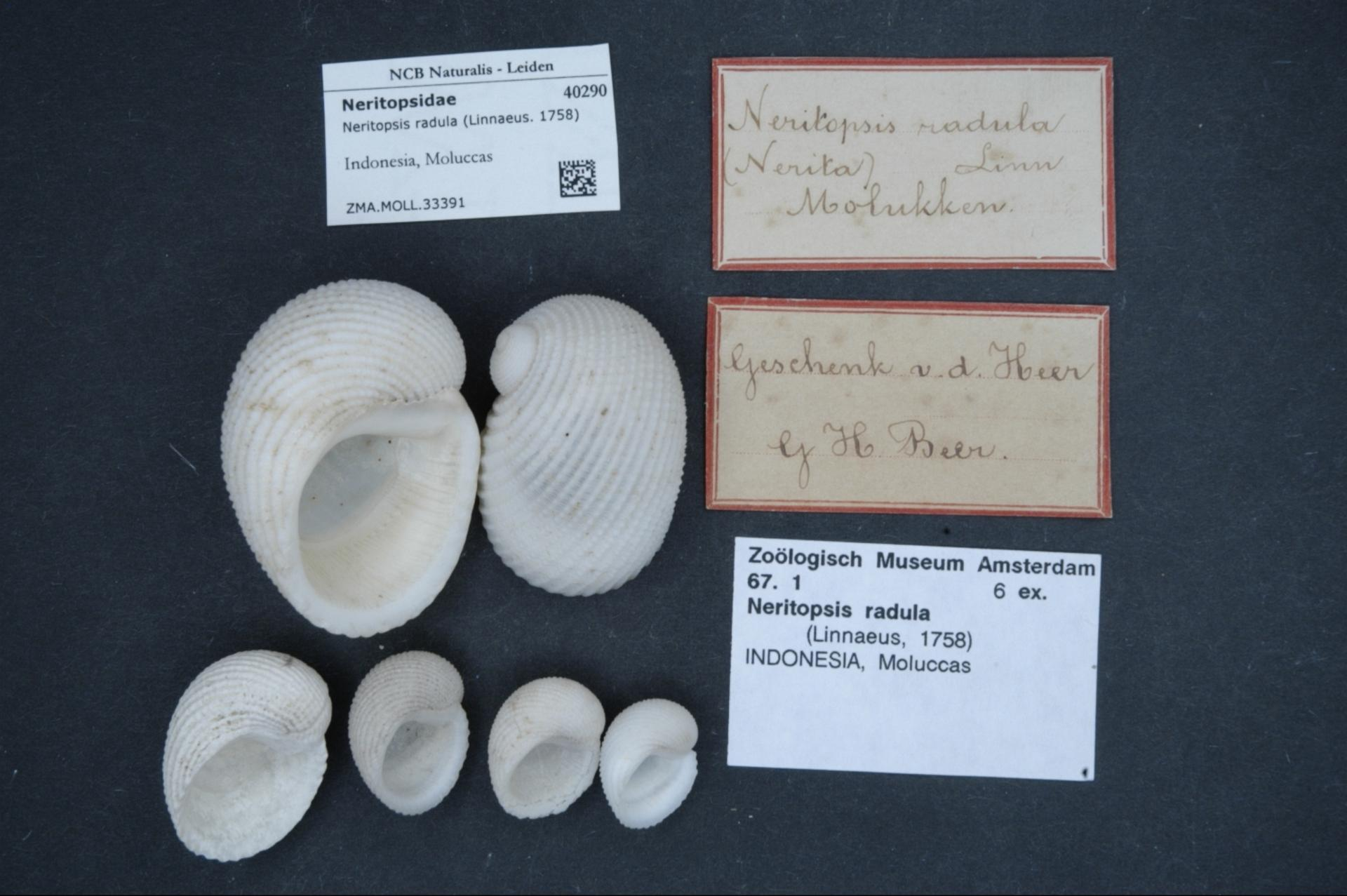
- Neritopsis radula shells

Scientific classification
- Kingdom: Animalia
- Phylum: Mollusca
- Class: Gastropoda
- Order: Cycloneritida
- Family: Neritopsidae
- Genus: Neritopsis
- Species: N. radula

Binomial name
- Neritopsis radula (Linnaeus, 1758)

= Neritopsis radula =

Species of gastropod

Neritopsis radula is a species of sea snail, a marine gastropod mollusk in the family Neritopsidae.

== Distribution ==
Indo-Pacific:

- Aldabra
- Madagascar
- Mascarene Basin
- Mauritius
- Red Sea
