= Falniowskia =

Scientific classification
- Kingdom: Animalia
- Phylum: Mollusca
- Class: Gastropoda
- Subclass: Caenogastropoda
- Order: Littorinimorpha
- Family: Hydrobiidae
- Subfamily: Pseudamnicolinae
- Genus: Falniowskia; Bernasconi, 1990

Genus of gastropods

Falniowskia is a genus of minute freshwater snails with an operculum, aquatic gastropod molluscs or micromolluscs in the family Hydrobiidae.

== Species ==
Species within the genus Falniowskia include:

- Falniowskia neglectissima (Falniowski & Steffek, 1989)
