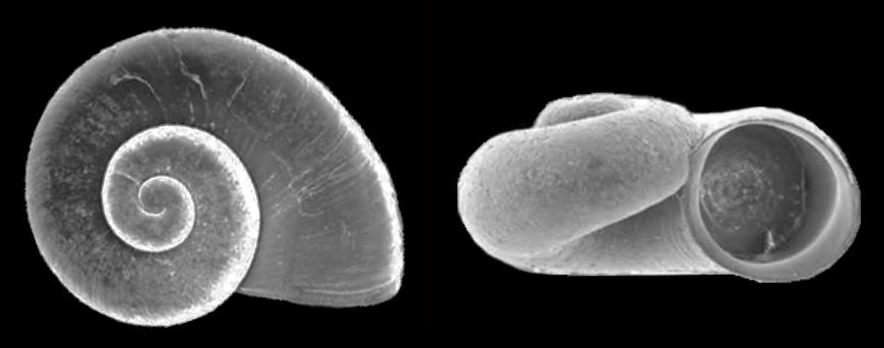
- Shell of Rifia yacoubii (paratype at MNHN, Paris)

Scientific classification
- Kingdom: Animalia
- Phylum: Mollusca
- Class: Gastropoda
- Subclass: Caenogastropoda
- Order: Littorinimorpha
- Superfamily: Truncatelloidea
- Family: Hydrobiidae
- Genus: Rifia; Ghamizi, 2020

Type species
- Rifia yacoubii Ghamizi, 2020

= Rifia =

Genus of gastropods

Rifia is a species of very small fresh water snail with an operculum, an aquatic operculate gastropod mollusks in the family Hydrobiidae.

== Species ==
Species in the genus Rifia include:

- Rifia yacoubii Ghamizi, 2020
