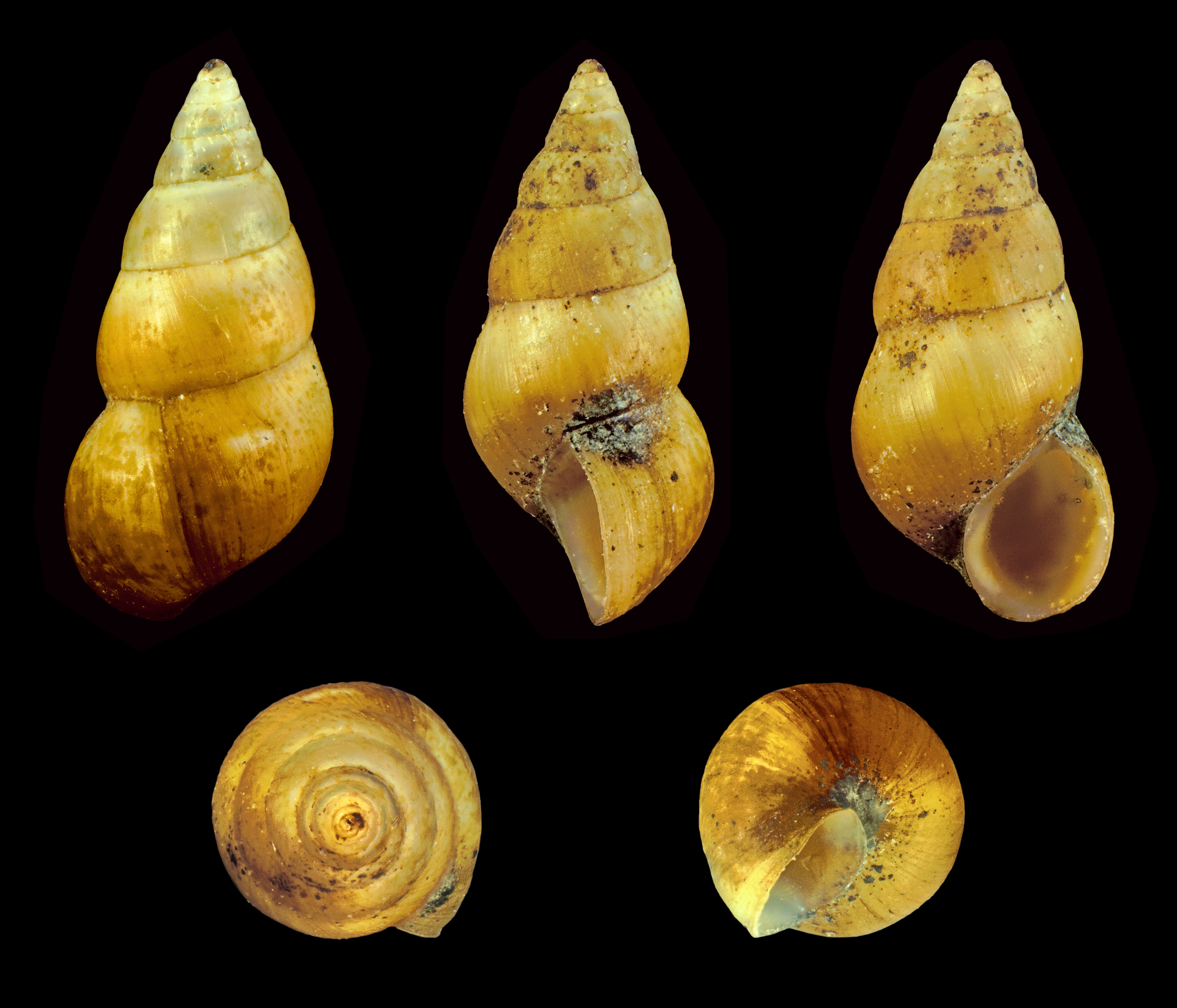
- Shell

Scientific classification
- Kingdom: Animalia
- Phylum: Mollusca
- Class: Gastropoda
- Subclass: Caenogastropoda
- Order: Littorinimorpha
- Family: Hydrobiidae
- Genus: Peringia
- Species: P. ulvae

Binomial name
- Peringia ulvae (Pennant, 1777)

Synonyms
- List: Assiminea recta Mousson, 1874 (dubious synonym); Hydrobia ulvae (Pennant, 1777); Hydrobia ulvae var. albida Jeffreys, 1867; Paludestrina bucheti Mabille, 1898 (dubious synonym); Peringia castroi Locard, 1899; Peringia cyclolabris Bourguignat, 1876; Peringia lusitanica Locard, 1899; Peringia paulinoi Locard, 1899; Rissoa barleei Jeffreys, 1847; Turbo subumbilicatus Montagu, 1803; Turbo ulvæ Pennant, 1777

= Peringia ulvae =

Species of gastropod

Peringia ulvae, commonly known as the Laver spire shell or mudsnail, is a European species of very small aquatic snail with gills and an operculum, a gastropod mollusk in the family Hydrobiidae.

This is arguably a marine snail, but it is often also listed as a non-marine species because it tolerates brackish water and lives in salt marshes and similar habitats.

Peringia ulvae is the type species of the genus Peringia.

== Distribution ==
This species occurs on the coasts of the Baltic Sea, the White Sea the eastern Atlantic Ocean and the western Mediterranean Sea, (the Mediterranean records may be in error) including:

- Great Britain
- Ireland
- The Netherlands

The type locality is "on the shores of Flintshire", Wales, United Kingdom. The distribution type is Oceanic Wide Temperate

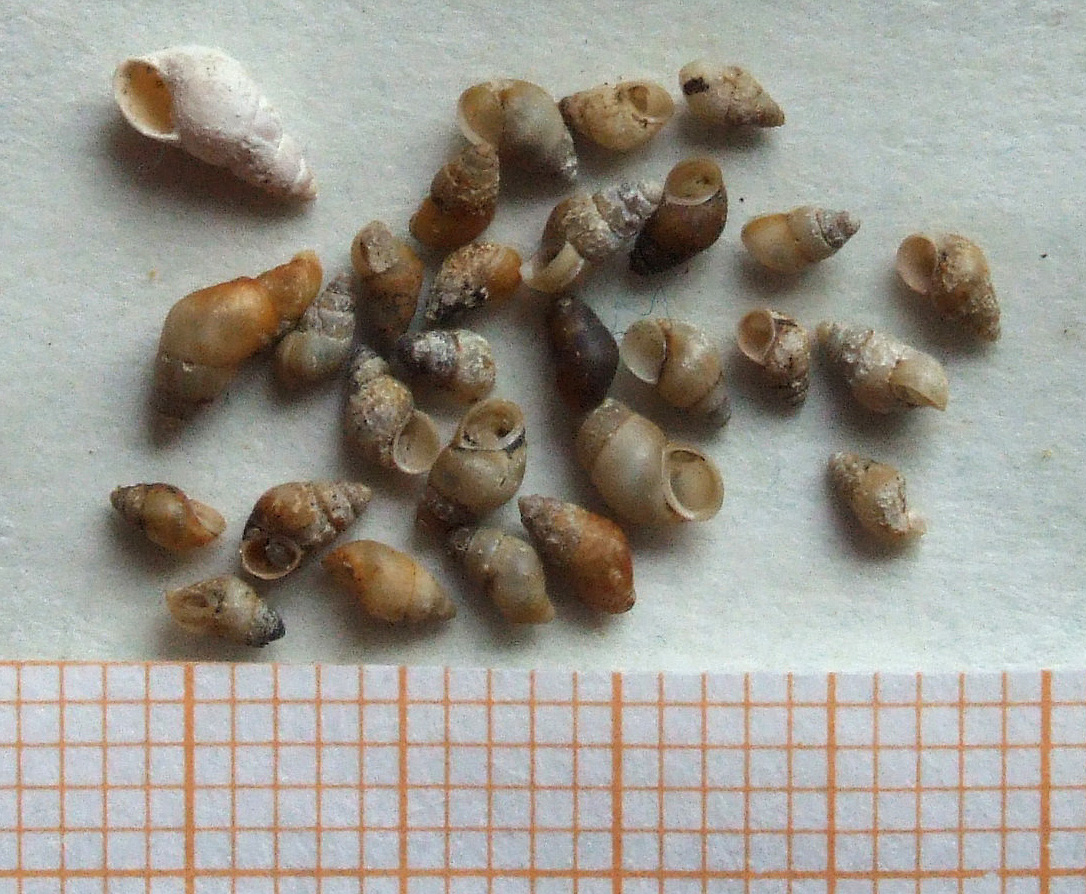
Shells of P. ulvae

The engraving of a shell of Peringia ulvae from its original description (1777) was very small

== Description ==
This species was originally described by Welsh naturalist Thomas Pennant in 1777. Pennant's original text (the type description) reads as follows:

Ulvae.

T. with four spires, the first ventricose; of a deep brown color; aperture oval.
Size of a grain of wheat.
Tab. lxxxvi. fig. 120.

Inhabits Ulva Lactuca on the shores of Flintshire.

"T." is an abbreviated word testa from Latin language, that means "shell".

The shell is often heavily corroded, usually whitish with brown peristome present on the last whorl. The shell has 5-7 very weakly convex whorls, that are regularly increasing but not always regularly rounded. The lip is attached to the last whorl.

The width of the shell is 2.5–3 mm. The height of the shell is 4-5.5 mm.

== Habitat ==
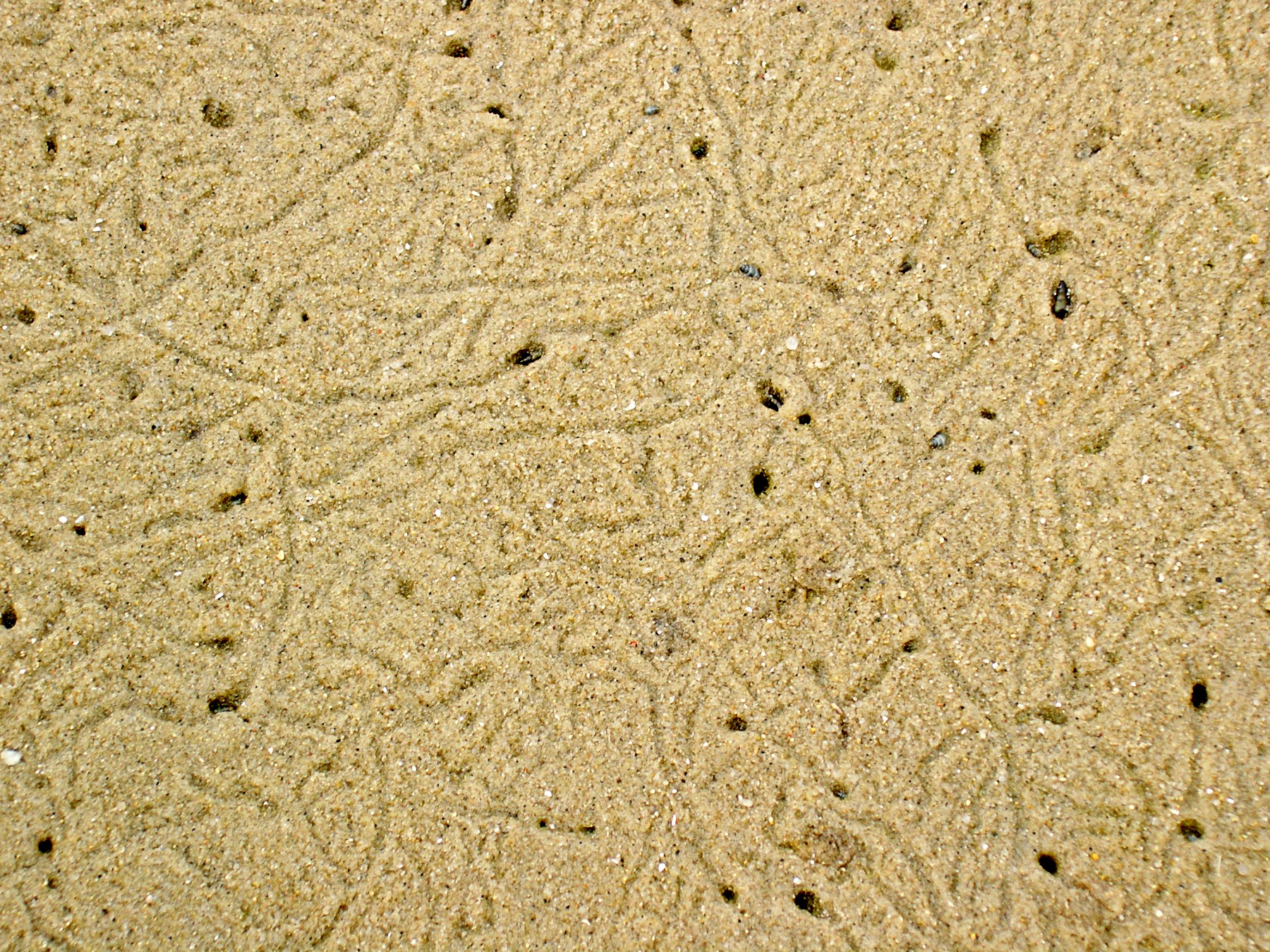
A number of individuals of Peringia ulvae on mud

Peringia ulvae is a widespread and abundant member of the benthic fauna of estuarine habitats and coastal brackish and salt waters. It is very common in brackish water and saltwater, in estuaries and salt marshes. It is most common in the upper half of the intertidal zone. It tolerates salinity 1.0-3.3 %.

Peringia ulvae seems to prefer more exposed localities with less vegetation than the mudsnails Ecrobia ventrosa and Hydrobia neglecta.

Peringia ulvae feeds on detritus and it also consumes seaweeds directly.

It is pederictional dioecious with sexes being easily identified through dissection. On the west coast of Wales this species has peaks of spawning activity in spring and autumn and produces planktotrophic larvae (veliger) that remain in the plankton for up to four weeks before settlement. This period of development affords the potential for dispersal to new habitats and mixing with geographically separate populations. The species provides an interesting case for molecular analysis as the pelagic dispersal phase raises fascinating questions on gene flow, differentiation, recruitment, and inbreeding, but there remains the potential for self-recruitment of estuarine populations.

One of its natural predators is the Arctic barrel-bubble (Retusa obtusa). In Ireland Peringia ulvae is an important source of food for overwintering waders.
