= Pontobelgrandiella =

Scientific classification
- Domain: Eukaryota
- Kingdom: Animalia
- Phylum: Mollusca
- Class: Gastropoda
- Subclass: Caenogastropoda
- Order: Littorinimorpha
- Family: Hydrobiidae
- Subfamily: Belgrandiellinae
- Genus: Pontobelgrandiella; Radoman, 1978

Genus of snails

Pontobelgrandiella is a genus of gastropods belonging to the family Hydrobiidae.

Species:

- Pontobelgrandiella angelovi (Pintér, 1968)
- Pontobelgrandiella bachkovoensis (Glöer & Georgiev, 2009)
- Pontobelgrandiella bulgarica (Angelov, 1972)
- Pontobelgrandiella bureschi (Angelov, 1976)
- Pontobelgrandiella delevae (Georgiev & Glöer, 2015)
- Pontobelgrandiella dobrostanica (Glöer & Georgiev, 2009)
- Pontobelgrandiella hessei (A.J.Wagner, 1928)
- Pontobelgrandiella hubenovi (Georgiev, 2012)
- Pontobelgrandiella lavrasi Boeters, P.L.Reischütz & A.Reischütz, 2017
- Pontobelgrandiella lomica (Georgiev & Glöer, 2015)
- Pontobelgrandiella maarensis (Georgiev, 2013)
- Pontobelgrandiella nitida (Angelov, 1972)
- Pontobelgrandiella pandurskii (Georgiev, 2011)
- Pontobelgrandiella petrovi (Georgiev, 2014)
- Pontobelgrandiella pusilla (Angelov, 1959)
- Pontobelgrandiella stanimirae (Georgiev, 2011)
- Pontobelgrandiella tanevi Georgiev, 2013
- Pontobelgrandiella zagoraensis (Glöer & Georgiev, 2009)
