= Neohoratia minuta =

Conservation status
- Data Deficient (IUCN 2.3)

Scientific classification
- Kingdom: Animalia
- Phylum: Mollusca
- Class: Gastropoda
- Subclass: Caenogastropoda
- Order: Littorinimorpha
- Family: Hydrobiidae
- Genus: Neohoratia
- Species: N. minuta

Binomial name
- Neohoratia minuta (Draparnaud, 1805)

Species of gastropod

Neohoratia minuta is a species of very small freshwater snails that have an operculum, aquatic operculate gastropod mollusks in the family Hydrobiidae. This species is endemic to Switzerland.
