= Neohoratia =

Scientific classification
- Domain: Eukaryota
- Kingdom: Animalia
- Phylum: Mollusca
- Class: Gastropoda
- Subclass: Caenogastropoda
- Order: Littorinimorpha
- Family: Hydrobiidae
- Genus: Neohoratia; Schütt, 1961

Genus of gastropods

Neohoratia is a genus of very small freshwater snails that have an operculum, aquatic operculate gastropod mollusks in the family Hydrobiidae.

== Species ==
Species within the genus Neohoratia include:

- Neohoratia minuta
