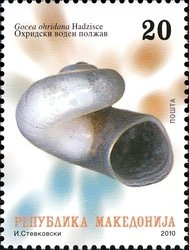
- Gocea ohridana depicted on a stamp

Conservation status
- Critically Endangered (IUCN 3.1)

Scientific classification
- Kingdom: Animalia
- Phylum: Mollusca
- Class: Gastropoda
- Subclass: Caenogastropoda
- Order: Littorinimorpha
- Family: Hydrobiidae
- Subfamily: Belgrandiinae
- Genus: Gocea; Hadžišče, 1956
- Species: G. ohridana

Binomial name
- Gocea ohridana Hadžišče, 1956

= Gocea =

Species of mollusc

Gocea ohridana is a species of freshwater snail within the family Hydrobiidae and the only species in the genus Gocea. It is found in Lake Ohrid, North Macedonia, in a small area of less than 10 square kilometres (3.9 sq mi). It lives in rocky areas along the shores of Lake Ohrid, being found in sublacustrine springs underneath stones as deep as 3 meters (9.8 ft) below the water's surface. It faces threats such as deforestation leading to erosion that can impact the snail's ability to filter water; pollution from sewage coming from major cities adjacent to the lake and from agricultural runoff into hydrologically connected Lake Prespa; and an increase in fire hazards in the region. Because of its strict range, low abundance in findings, and threats to its specific environment, it has been classified as a 'Critically endangered' species by the IUCN Red List.
