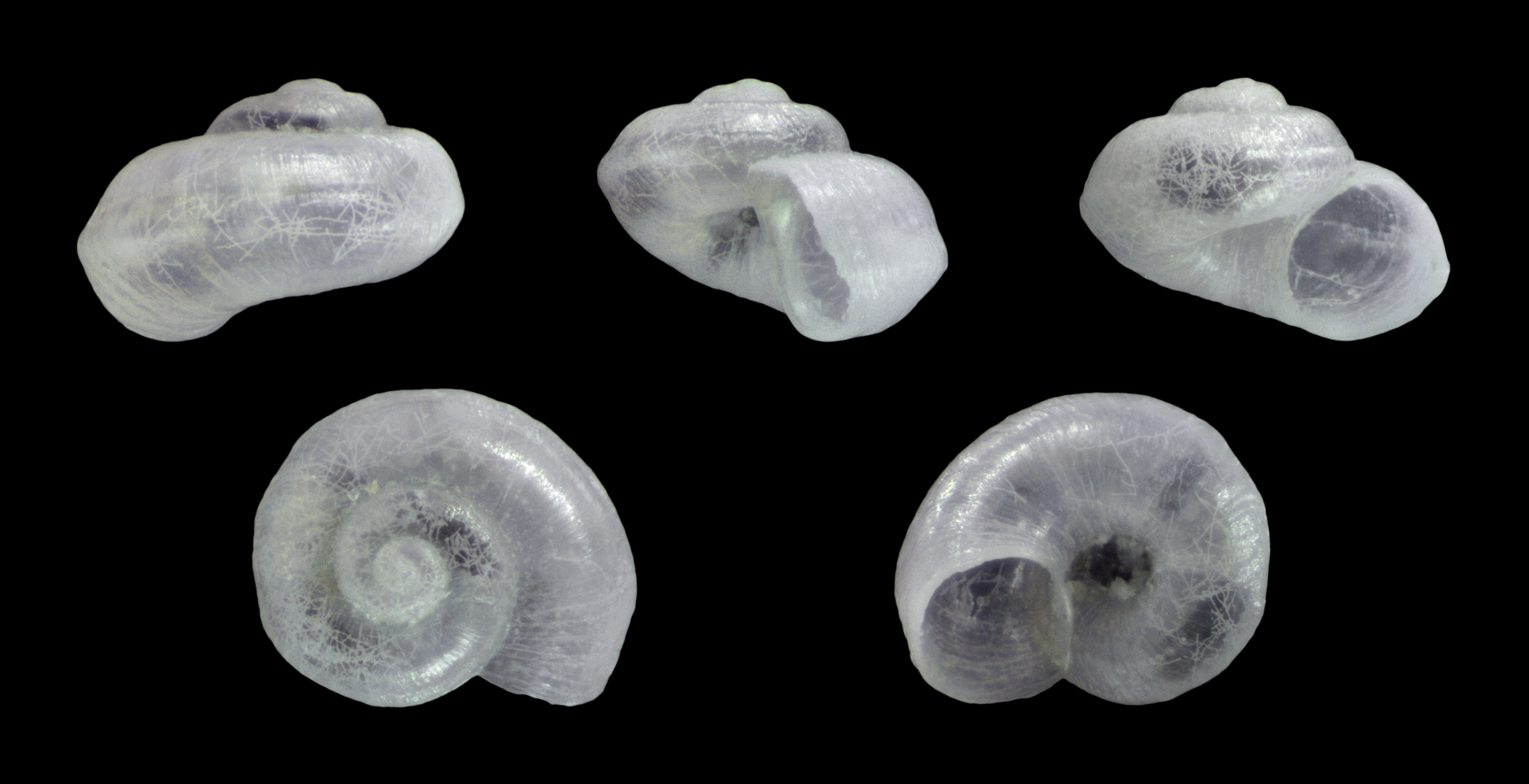
- Ohridohauffenia depressa (Radoman, 1957)

Scientific classification
- Kingdom: Animalia
- Phylum: Mollusca
- Class: Gastropoda
- Subclass: Caenogastropoda
- Order: Littorinimorpha
- Family: Hydrobiidae
- Subfamily: Belgrandiinae
- Genus: Ohridohauffenia; Hadzisce, 1959

= Ohridohauffenia =

Genus of gastropods

Ohridohauffenia is a genus of very small freshwater snails with an operculum, aquatic gastropod mollusks in the family Hydrobiidae, the river snails.

== Species ==
Species within the genus Ohridohauffenia include:

- Ohridohauffenia depressa Radoman, 1964
- Ohridohauffenia drimica Radoman, 1964
- Ohridohauffenia minuta Radoman, 1955
- Ohridohauffenia rotonda Radoman, 1964
- Ohridohauffenia sanctinaumi Radoman, 1964
- Ohridohauffenia sublitoralis Radoman, 1963
