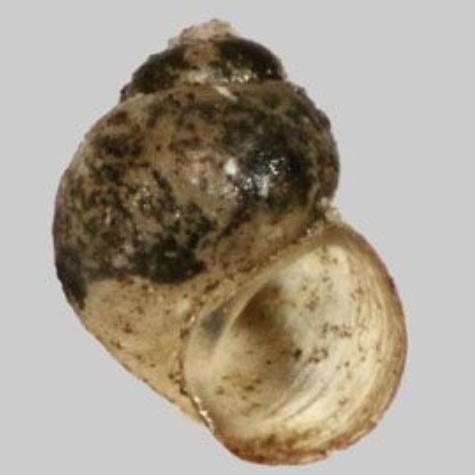
- Shell of Grossuana avandasensis

Scientific classification
- Kingdom: Animalia
- Phylum: Mollusca
- Class: Gastropoda
- Subclass: Caenogastropoda
- Order: Littorinimorpha
- Family: Hydrobiidae
- Genus: Grossuana; Radoman, 1983

Type species
- Grossuana serbica Radoman, 1973

Synonyms
- Strandzhia Georgiev & Glöer, 2013 junior subjective synonym

= Grossuana =

Genus of gastropods

Grossuana is a genus of very small freshwater snails, aquatic gastropod mollusks in the family Hydrobiidae.

== Distribution ==
These snails are found in Greece and Bulgaria.

== Species ==
Species within the genus Grossuana include:

- Grossuana angeltsekovi Glöer & Georgiev, 2009
- Grossuana arslanarum D. A. Odabaşı, 2022
- Grossuana avandasensis Glöer, Reuselaars & Papavasileiou, 2018
- Grossuana azizsancari D. A. Odabaşı, 2022
- Grossuana bayramicensis D. A. Odabaşı, 2022
- Grossuana beroni Georgiev & Glöer, 2020
- Grossuana bythinellopenia (Georgiev & Glöer, 2013)
- Grossuana canakkalensis D. A. Odabaşı, 2022
- Grossuana codreanui (Grossu, 1946)
- Grossuana delphica (Radoman, 1973)
- Grossuana derventica Georgiev & Glöer, 2013
- Grossuana durrelli Georgiev & Glöer, 2018
- Grossuana euxina (A. J. Wagner, 1928)
- Grossuana falniowskii Georgiev, Glöer, Dedov & Irikov, 2015
- Grossuana kayrae D. A. Odabaşı, 2019
- Grossuana kazdagiana D. A. Odabaşı, 2022
- Grossuana kirkgozlerensis D. A. Odabaşı, 2022
- Grossuana macedonica Radoman, 1973
- Grossuana maceradica Boeters, Glöer & Slavevska-Stamenković, 2017
- Grossuana marginata (Westerlund, 1881)
- Grossuana onderi D. A. Odabaşı, 2022
- Grossuana radostinae Georgiev, 2012
- Grossuana remesianae Radoman, 1973
- Grossuana serbica Radoman, 1973
- Grossuana sidironerensis Glöer, Reuselaars & Papavasileiou, 2018
- Grossuana skupica Radoman, 1973
- Grossuana slavyanica Georgiev & Glöer, 2013
- Grossuana stenaensis Glöer, Reuselaars & Papavasileiou, 2018
- Grossuana tembii Boeters, Glöer & Falniowski, 2018
- Grossuana thasia Georgiev & Glöer, 2020
- Grossuana thracica Glöer & Georgiev, 2009
- Grossuana vurliana (Radoman, 1966)

Synonyms

- Grossuana aytosensis Georgiev, 2012: synonym of Radomaniola aytosensis (Georgiev, 2012) (original combination)
- Grossuana haesitans (Westerlund, 1881): synonym of Radomaniola haesitans (Westerlund, 1881)
- Grossuana hohenackeri (Küster, 1853): synonym of Lerniana tritonum (Bourguignat, 1852)
