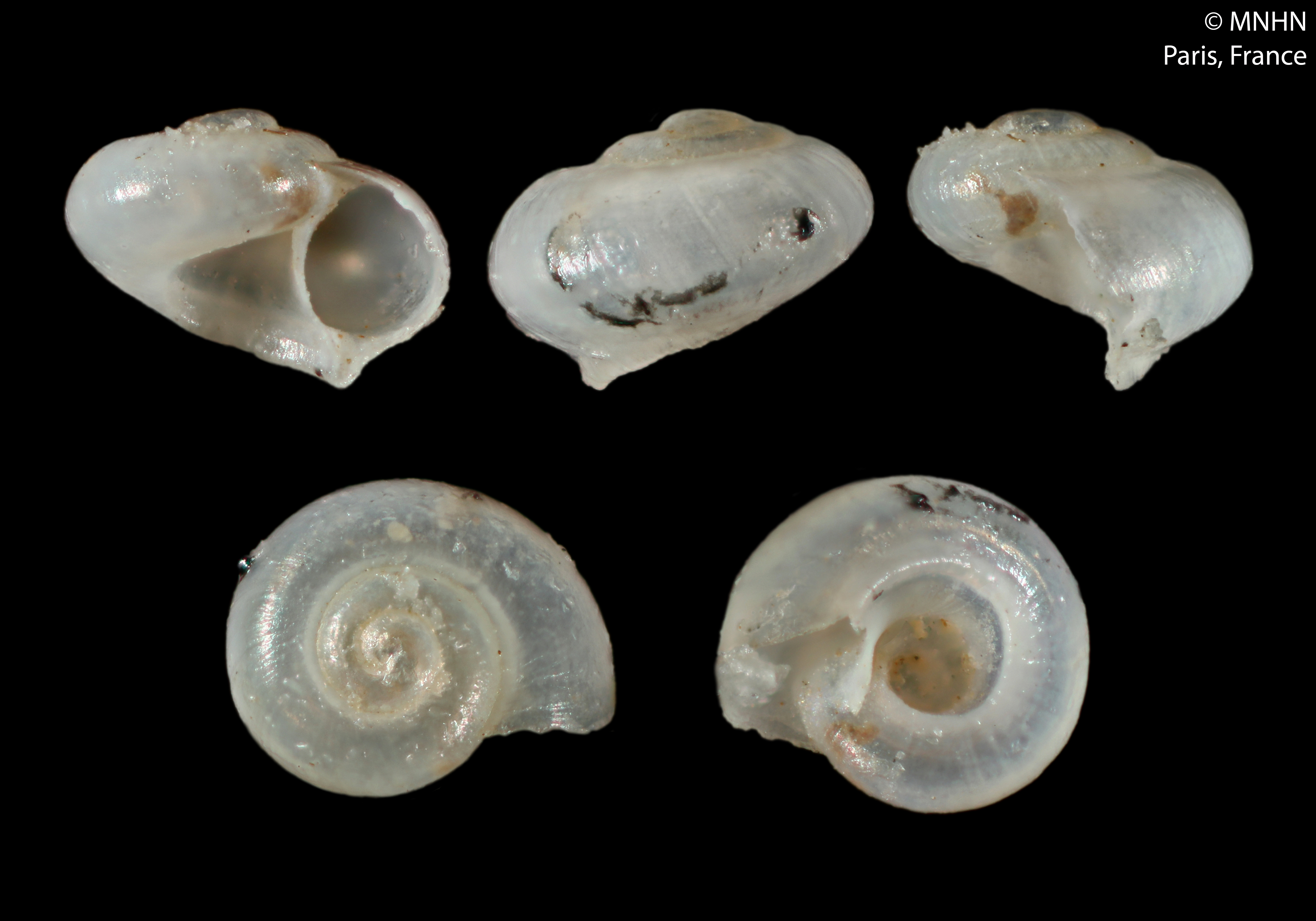
- Shell of Navalis perforatus (paratype at MNHN, Paris)

Scientific classification
- Kingdom: Animalia
- Phylum: Mollusca
- Class: Gastropoda
- Subclass: Caenogastropoda
- Order: Littorinimorpha
- Superfamily: Truncatelloidea
- Family: Hydrobiidae
- Genus: Navalis; Quiñonero-Salgado & Rolán, 2017

Type species
- Navalis perforatus Quiñonero-Salgado & Rolán, 2017

= Navalis =

Genus of gastropods

Navalis is a genus of minute freshwater snails with an operculum, aquatic gastropod molluscs or micromolluscs in the Hydrobiidae family.

== Species ==
- Navalis edetanus Talaván-Serna, Quiñonero-Salgado, Á. Alonso & Rolán, 2021
- Navalis perforatus Quiñonero-Salgado & Rolán, 2017
