= Stiobia =

Scientific classification
- Kingdom: Animalia
- Phylum: Mollusca
- Class: Gastropoda
- Subclass: Caenogastropoda
- Order: Littorinimorpha
- Family: Hydrobiidae
- Genus: Stiobia; F. G. Thompson & McCaleb, 1978

Genus of gastropods

Stiobia is a genus of minute freshwater snails with an operculum, aquatic gastropod molluscs or micromolluscs in the family Hydrobiidae.

== Species ==
Species within the genus Stiobia'' include:

- Sculpin snail, Stiobia nana
