= Romania (gastropod) =

Romania Temporal range: 15.97–13.65 Ma Miocene

Scientific classification
- Kingdom: Animalia
- Phylum: Mollusca
- Class: Gastropoda
- Subclass: Caenogastropoda
- Order: Littorinimorpha
- Superfamily: Truncatelloidea
- Family: Hydrobiidae
- Genus: †Romania; Cossmann, 1913

Type species
- †Juliania expansa Roman, 1912

Genus of gastropods

Romania is an extinct genus of freshwater snails, aquatic gastropod molluscs in the family Hydrobiidae.

== Species ==
Species within the genus Romania include:

- †Romania expansa (Roman, 1912)
- †Romania fastigata Neubauer & Harzhauser, 2012
- †Romania nikolajevici (Brusina, 1902)
