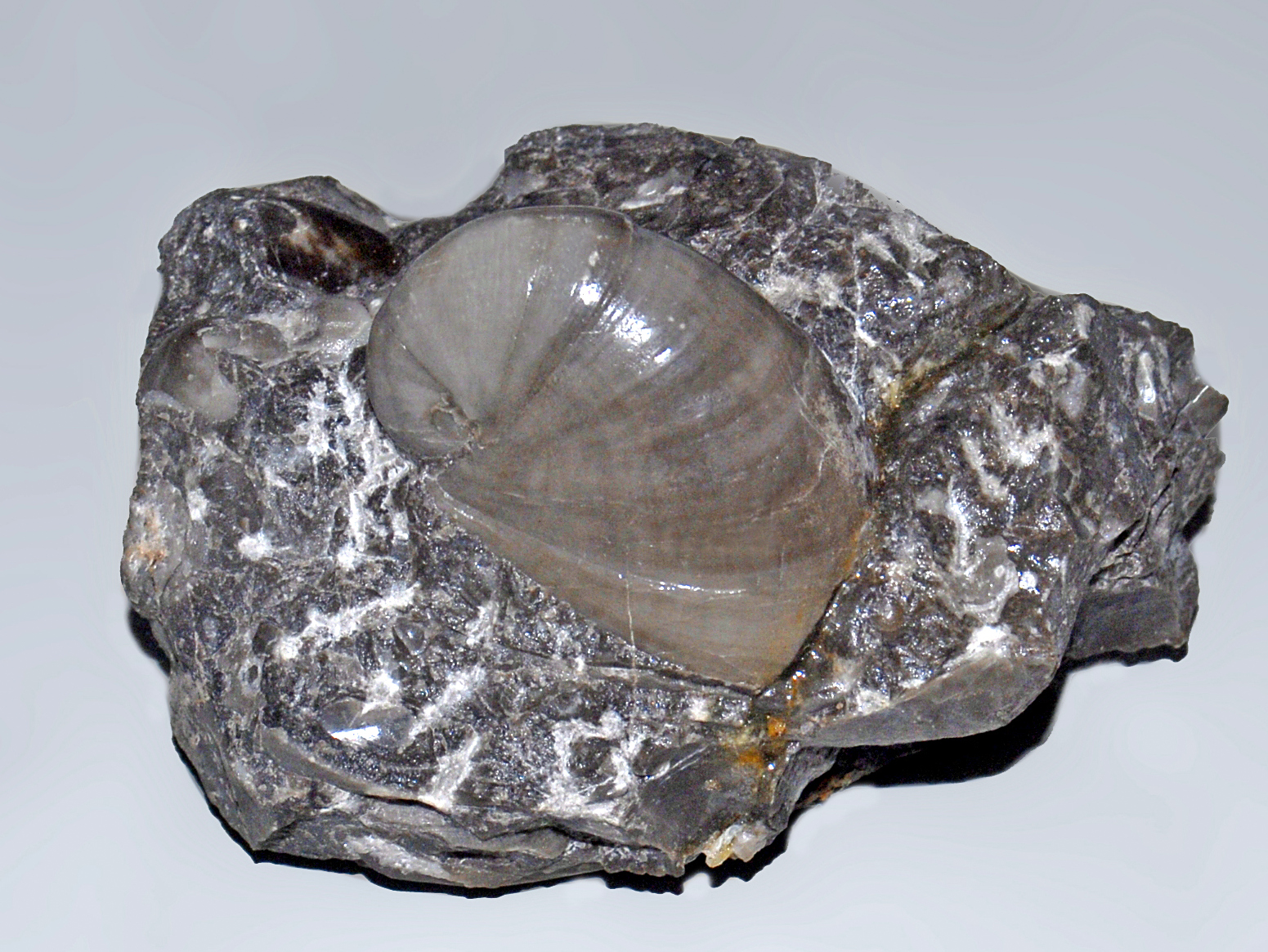
- Naticopsis from Ladinian of Italy

Scientific classification
- Domain: Eukaryota
- Kingdom: Animalia
- Phylum: Mollusca
- Class: Gastropoda
- Subclass: Neritimorpha
- Order: Cycloneritida
- Family: Neritopsidae
- Subfamily: †Naticopsinae
- Genus: †Naticopsis; McCoy, 1844

Synonyms
- Diaphorostoma (Naticopsis); Naticopsis (Neritomopsis) Waagen 1880

= Naticopsis =

Naticopsis Temporal range: Early Devonian – Triassic 412.3–242.0 Ma

Extinct genus of gastropods

Naticopsis is an extinct genus of small sea snails belonging to the family Neritopsidae.

== Fossil records ==
This genus is known in the fossil record from the Devonian to the Triassic periods (from about 412.3 to 242.0 million years ago). Fossils of species within this genus have been found in China, United States, Europe, Cambodia, Iran, Japan, Malaysia and Pakistan.

== Species ==
Species within this genus include:

- †Naticopsis altonensis
- †Naticopsis apollinis
- †Naticopsis bowsheri
- †Naticopsis carleyana
- †Naticopsis carlyana
- †Naticopsis chesterensis
- †Naticopsis comperta
- †Naticopsis confusa
- †Naticopsis consobrina
- †Naticopsis convoluta
- †Naticopsis cretacea
- †Naticopsis deformis
- †Naticopsis depressa
- †Naticopsis efossa
- †Naticopsis errans
- †Naticopsis eruca
- †Naticopsis glomerosa
- †Naticopsis gracilis
- †Naticopsis hallii
- †Naticopsis inflata
- †Naticopsis inornata
- †Naticopsis insculpta
- †Naticopsis irregularis
- †Naticopsis judithae
- †Naticopsis kaibabensis
- †Naticopsis kayseri
- †Naticopsis laeta
- †Naticopsis levis
- †Naticopsis macrostoma
- †Naticopsis manitobensis
- †Naticopsis marginata
- †Naticopsis mariona
- †Naticopsis marthaae
- †Naticopsis microtricha
- †Naticopsis minuta
- †Naticopsis naticaeformis
- †Naticopsis nexicosta
- †Naticopsis oblata
- †Naticopsis opimavoluta
- †Naticopsis osbornei
- †Naticopsis ovoidea
- †Naticopsis pegmihumerosa
- †Naticopsis phillipsi
- †Naticopsis planifrons
- †Naticopsis phebeia
- †Naticopsis plena
- †Naticopsis plicatula
- †Naticopsis primigenia
- †Naticopsis protei
- †Naticopsis protogaea
- †Naticopsis purpura
- †Naticopsis remex
- †Naticopsis ruchholtzi
- †Naticopsis scintilla
- †Naticopsis semistriata
- †Naticopsis sirodoti
- †Naticopsis subovata
- †Naticopsis suturicompta
- †Naticopsis taemasensis
- †Naticopsis tortum
- †Naticopsis transversa
- †Naticopsis trevorpaticiciorum
- †Naticopsis tumescens
- †Naticopsis variata
- †Naticopsis velox
- †Naticopsis wakehami
- †Naticopsis waterlooensis
- †Naticopsis wortheni
- †Naticopsis wortheniana
