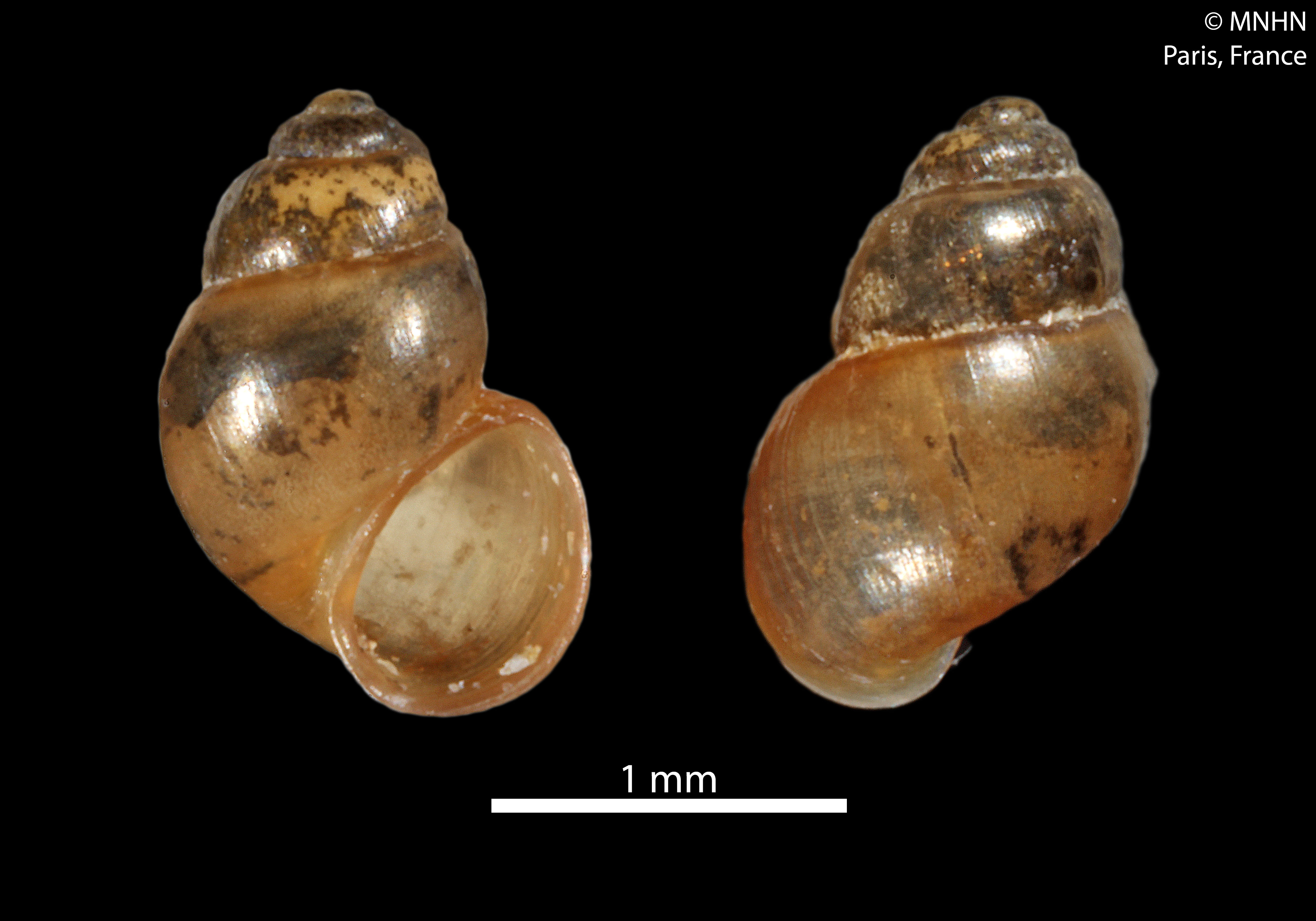
- Shell of Mercuria bourguignati (paratype at MNHN, Paris)

Scientific classification
- Kingdom: Animalia
- Phylum: Mollusca
- Class: Gastropoda
- Subclass: Caenogastropoda
- Order: Littorinimorpha
- Superfamily: Truncatelloidea
- Family: Hydrobiidae
- Subfamily: Mercuriinae; Boeters & Falkner, 2017
- Genus: Mercuria; Boeters, 1971

Type species
- Amnicola confusa Frauenfeld, 1863

Synonyms
- Anatiniana Fagot, 1892 (invalid: junior homonym of Anatiniana Bourguignat, 1881 [Unionidae]); Cyrniacana Fagot, 1892 (declared nomen oblitum vs Mercuria nomen protectum); Similiana Fagot, 1892 (invalid: junior homonym of Similiana Fagot, 1891 [Chondrinidae])

= Mercuria (gastropod) =

Genus of gastropods

Mercuria is a genus of small brackish water snails or freshwater snails with a gill and an operculum, aquatic gastropod mollusks in the family Hydrobiidae.

== Species ==
Species within the genus Mercuria include:

- Mercuria anatina (Poiret, 1801)
- Mercuria atlasica Mabrouki, Glöer & Taybi, 2021
- †Mercuria baccinelliana Esu & Girotti, 2015
- Mercuria bakeri Glöer, Boeters & Walther, 2015
- Mercuria balearica (Paladilhe, 1869)
- Mercuria baudoniana (Gassies, 1859)
- Mercuria bayonnensis (Locard, 1894)
- †Mercuria boetersi Schlickum & Strauch, 1979
- Mercuria bourguignati Glöer, Bouzid & Boeters, 2010
- Mercuria corsensis Boeters & Falkner, 2017
- Mercuria gauthieri Glöer, Bouzid & Boeters, 2010
- †Mercuria glaberrima (O. Boettger, 1875)
- Mercuria globulina (Letourneux & Bourguignat, 1887)
- †Mercuria helicella (F. Sandberger, 1858)
- Mercuria letourneuxiana (Bourguignat, 1862)
- Mercuria maceana (Paladilhe, 1869)
- Mercuria melitensis (Paladilhe, 1869)
- Mercuria meridionalis (Risso, 1826)
- Mercuria midarensis Boulaassafer, Ghamizi & Delicado, 2018
- Mercuria punica (Letourneux & Bourguignat, 1887)
- Mercuria pycnocheilia (Bourguignat, 1862)
- Mercuria rolani Glöer, Boeters & Walther, 2015
- Mercuria saharica (Letourneux & Bourguignat, 1887)
- Mercuria sarahae (Paladilhe, 1869)
- Mercuria similis (Draparnaud, 1805)
- Mercuria tachoensis (Frauenfeld, 1865)
- Mercuria tensiftensis Boulaassafer, Ghamizi & Delicado, 2018
- Mercuria tingitana Glöer, Boeters & Walther, 2015
- †Mercuria vanparysi Marquet et al., 2008
- Mercuria zopissa (Paulucci, 1882)

Species brought into synonymy

- Mercuria confusa (Frauenfeld, 1863): synonym of Mercuria similis (Draparnaud, 1805)
- Mercuria edmundi Boeters, 1986: synonym of Mercuria tachoensis (Frauenfeld, 1865) (junior synonym)
- Mercuria emiliana (Paladilhe, 1869): synonym of Pseudamnicola emilianus (Paladilhe, 1869)
- Mercuria perforata (Bourguignat, 1862) : synonym of Pseudamnicola dupotetiana (Forbes, 1838)
- Mercuria vindilica (Paladilhe, 1870): synonym of Mercuria sarahae vindilica (Paladilhe, 1870)
