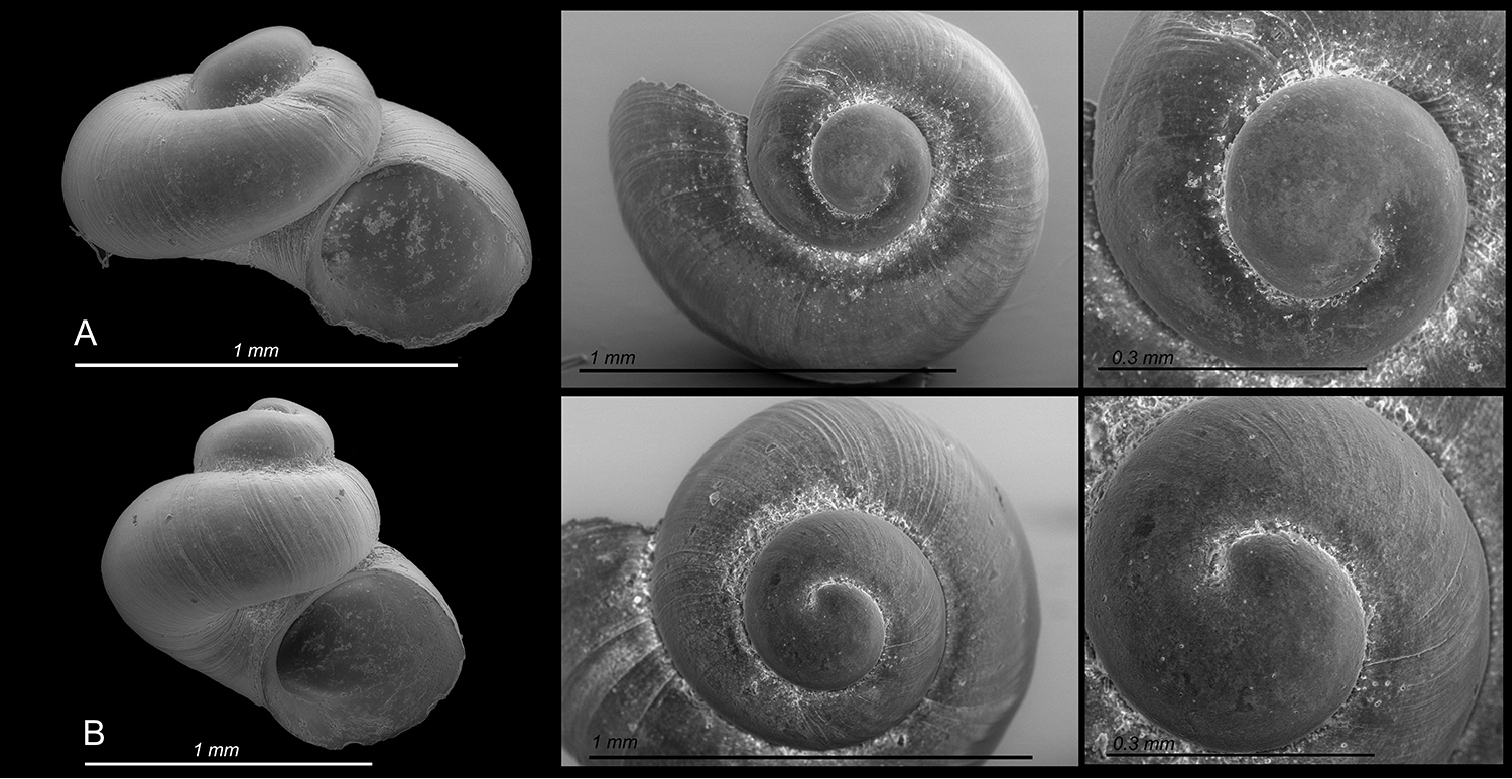
- SEM photo of Horatia ozimeci

Scientific classification
- Kingdom: Animalia
- Phylum: Mollusca
- Class: Gastropoda
- Subclass: Caenogastropoda
- Order: Littorinimorpha
- Superfamily: Truncatelloidea
- Family: Hydrobiidae
- Subfamily: Horatiinae
- Genus: Horatia; Bourguignat, 1887

Type species
- Horatia klecakiana Bourguignat, 1887

Synonyms
- Aristidia Bourguignat, 1887; Horatia (Horatia) Bourguignat, 1887 · alternate representation

= Horatia (gastropod) =

Horatia Temporal range: Late Pleistocene to Recent

Genus of molluscs

Horatia is a genus of gastropod molluscs, comprising a small group of minute stygobiont freshwater snails with valvatoid shells, belonging to the subfamily Horatiinae of the family Hydrobiidae.

It was described by Jules René Bourguignat in 1887.

== Species ==
- Horatia klecakiana Bourguignat, 1887
- Horatia knorri Schütt, 1961
- Horatia macedonica (Kuščer, 1937)
- Horatia novoselensis Radoman, 1966
- Horatia ozimeci Grego & Falniowski, 2021
- Horatia parvula (Naegele, 1894)
- Horatia podvisensis Glöer & Reuselaars, 2020
- Horatia schlosseri (Royo Gómez, 1922)
- Horatia sturmi Rosenhauer, 1856
- Horatia stygorumina Grego & Rysiewska, 2021

Synonyms

- Horatia albanica Bourguignat, 1887: synonym of Horatia klecakiana Bourguignat, 1887 (a junior synonym)
- Horatia birsteini Starobogatov, 1962: synonym of Pontohoratia birsteini (Starobogatov, 1962) (original combination)
- Horatia borutzkii Zhadin, 1923: synonym of Motsametia borutzkii (Zhadin, 1923) (original combination)
- Horatia brusinae Radoman, 1953: synonym of Pseudohoratia brusinae (Radoman, 1953) (basionym)
- Horatia burnarbasa Schütt, 1964: synonym of Islamia burnarbasa (Schütt, 1964) (original combination)
- Horatia erythropomatia (Hauffen, 1856): synonym of Erythropomatiana erythropomatia (Hauffen, 1856): synonym of Hauffenia erythropomatia (Hauffen, 1856) (unaccepted combination)
- Horatia fontinalis Bourguignat, 1887: synonym of Horatia klecakiana Bourguignat, 1887 (a junior synonym)
- Horatia gatoa Boeters, 1980: synonym of Iberhoratia gatoa (Boeters, 1980) (basionym)
- Horatia hadei E. Gittenberger, 1982: synonym of Daphniola hadei (E. Gittenberger, 1982) (unaccepted > superseded combination)
- Horatia letourneuxi Bourguignat, 1887: synonym of Horatia klecakiana Bourguignat, 1887 (a junior synonym)
- Horatia ljovuschkini Starobogatov, 1962: synonym of Pontohoratia birsteini (Starobogatov, 1962)
- Horatia lucidula Angelov, 1967: synonym of Hauffenia lucidula (Angelov, 1967)
- Horatia marina Logvinenko & Starobogatov, 1969: synonym of Andrusovia dybowskii Brusina, 1903 (junior subjective synonym)
- Horatia nelsonensis Climo, 1977: synonym of Platypyrgus nelsonensis (Climo, 1977) (original combination)
- Horatia obliqua Bourguignat, 1887: synonym of Horatia klecakiana Bourguignat, 1887 (a junior synonym)
- Horatia obtusa Bourguignat, 1887: synonym of Horatia klecakiana Bourguignat, 1887 (a junior synonym)
- Horatia palustris Bourguignat, 1887: synonym of Horatia klecakiana Bourguignat, 1887 (a junior synonym)
- Horatia polinskii Radoman, 1953: synonym of Pseudohoratia ochridana (Poliński, 1929) (a junior synonym)
- Horatia praeclara Bourguignat, 1887: synonym of Horatia klecakiana Bourguignat, 1887 (a junior synonym)
- Horatia sanctizaumi Radoman, 1964: synonym of Zaumia sanctizaumi (Radoman, 1964)
- Horatia servaini Bourguignat, 1887: synonym of Islamia valvataeformis (Möllendorff, 1873)
- Horatia sokolovi Starobogatov, 1962: synonym of Pontohoratia birsteini (Starobogatov, 1962)
- Horatia tellinii Pollonera, 1898: synonym of Hauffenia tellinii (Pollonera, 1898) (original combination)
- Horatia verlikana Bourguignat, 1887: synonym of Horatia klecakiana Bourguignat, 1887 (a junior synonym)
