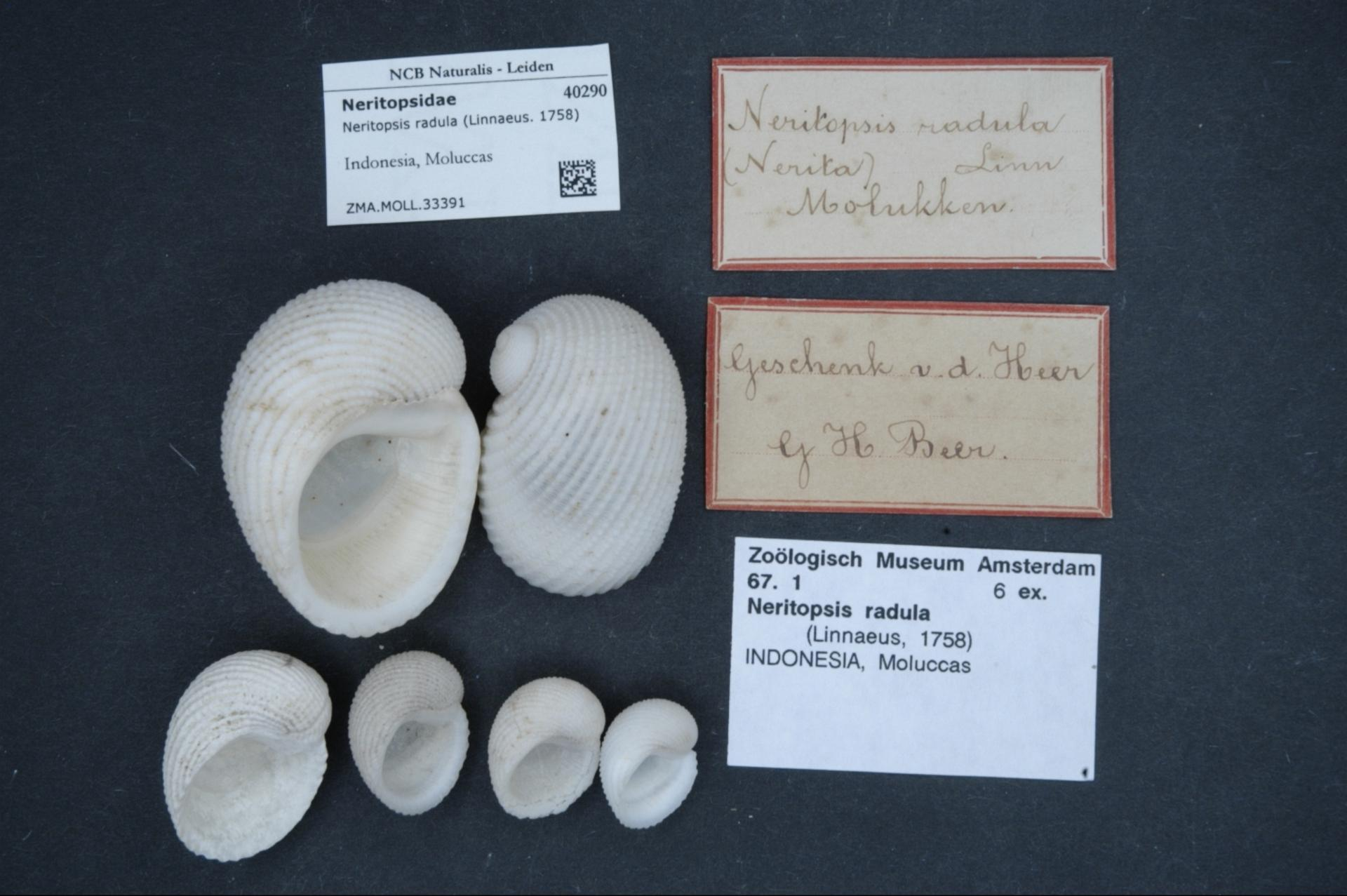
- Neritopsis radula shells

Scientific classification
- Kingdom: Animalia
- Phylum: Mollusca
- Class: Gastropoda
- Order: Cycloneritida
- Superfamily: Neritopsoidea
- Family: Neritopsidae; Gray, 1847

= Neritopsidae =

Family of gastropods

Neritopsidae is a family of small sea snails and freshwater snails in the clade Cycloneritimorpha (according to the taxonomy of the Gastropoda by Bouchet & Rocroi, 2005).

The great majority of species within this family are only known as fossils. The few species which are extant are sometimes termed "living fossils".

== Taxonomy ==
=== 2005 taxonomy ===
This family consists of three following subfamilies (according to the taxonomy of the Gastropoda by Bouchet & Rocroi, 2005):

- Neritopsinae Gray, 1847
- † Naticopsinae Waagen, 1880 - synonym: Hologyridae Kittl, 1899
- † Paffrathiinae Heidelberg, 2001

=== 2007 taxonomy ===
Bandel (2007) have established two new subfamilies. But he recognizes Naticopsinae at family level as Naticopsidae with newly created subfamilies in it.

- Neritopsinae Gray, 1847
- † Paffrathiinae Heidelberg, 2001 - to be clarified if Bandel recognized this family. It is not mentioned in his work Bandel (2007).
- † Cassianopsinae Bandel, 2007
- † Colubrellopsinae Bandel, 2007

== Genera ==
Genera within the family Neritopsidae include:

The only extant genera are Neritopsis and Pluviostilla from subfamily Neritopsinae.

Subfamily Neritopsinae

- Neritopsis Grateloup, 1832
- Pluviostilla Kase & Kano, 1999 - belongs to the subfamily Neritopsidae incertae sedis (temporary name)à
- Genus † Bandelopsis Frýda, Blodgett & Stanley, 2003
  - † Bandelopsis oregonensis
- Genus † Byzantia Kosnik, 1997
  - † Byzantia obliqua
- Genus † Dahmeria
- Genus † Devononerita
  - † Devononerita brevis
  - † Devononerita brevispira
  - † Devononerita megalacantha
  - † Devononerita typica
- Genus † Hungariella
- Genus † Neritoptyx
- Genus † Nuetzelopsis
  - † Nuetzelopsis orchardi
  - † Nuetzelopsis tozeri
- Genus † Praeturbonitella
  - † Praeturbonitella kochi
- Genus † Trachydomia
  - † Trachydomia newelli
  - † Trachydomia nodosa
  - † Trachydomia oweni
  - † Trachydomia raymondi
  - † Trachydomia turbonitella
  - † Trachydomia whitei
- Genus † Trachyspira
- Genus † Turbonitella
  - † Turbonitella biserialis
  - † Turbonitella fraterna
  - † Turbonitella humilis
  - † Turbonitella ovoides
  - † Turbonitella primula
  - † Turbonitella proligera
  - † Turbonitella pusilla
  - † Turbonitella semisulcatus
  - † Turbonitella strialata
  - † Turbonitella trunculinoda
  - † Turbonitella tuberculata
  - † Turbonitella ussheri
- Genus † Wallowiella Frýda, Blodgett & Stanley, 2003
  - † Wallowiella vallieri
- Genus † Weitschatopsis Frýda, Blodgett & Stanley, 2003
  - † Weitschatopsis pulchra

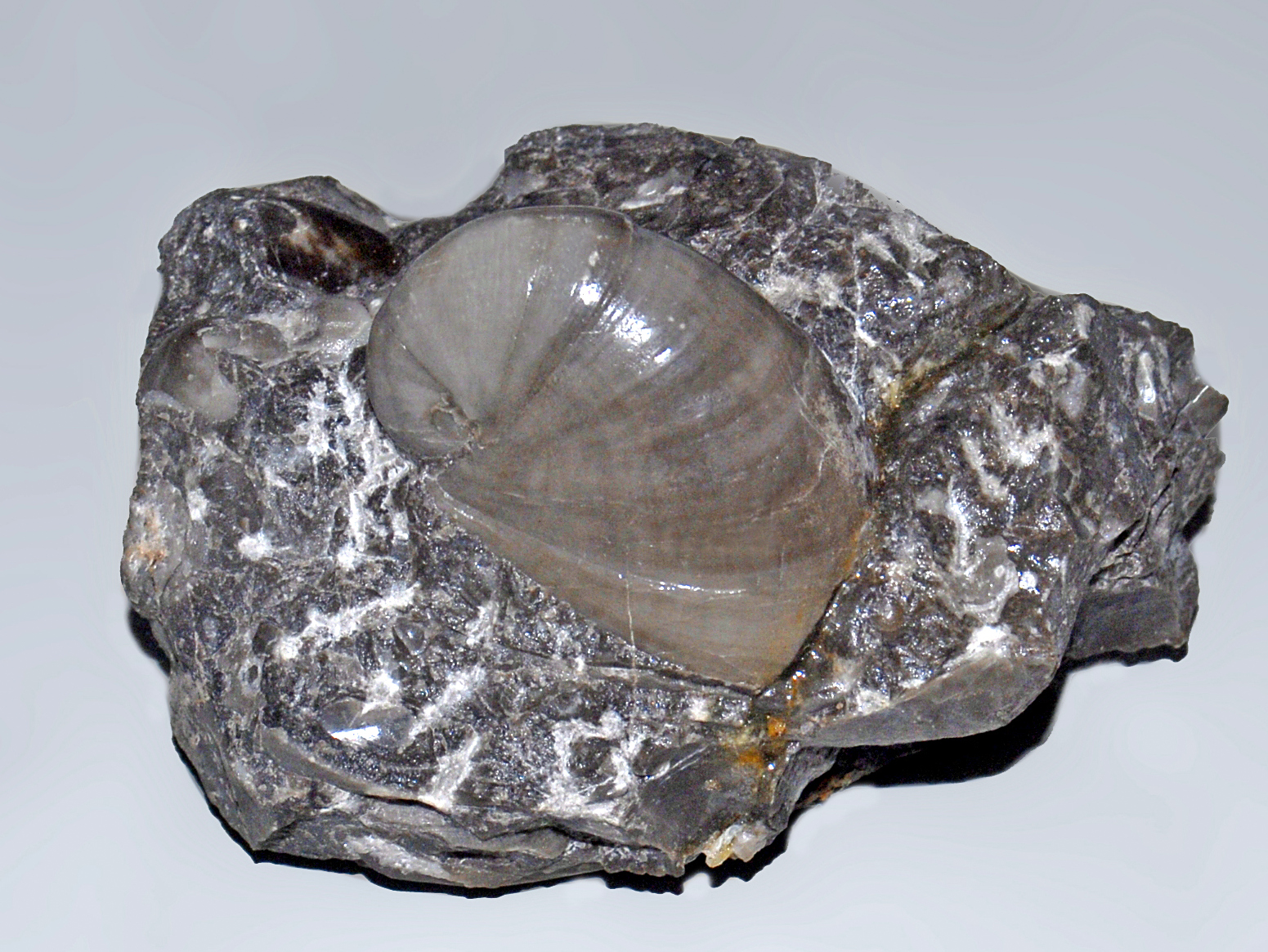
Naticopsis from Triassic of Italy.

Subfamily † Naticopsinae

- Genus † Damesia
- Genus † Dicosmos
- Genus † Frombachia
- Genus † Jedria
  - † Jedria deckeri
  - † Jedria meeki
  - † Jedria ventrica
- Genus † Naticopsis McCoy, 1844
- Genus † Pachyomphalus
- Genus † Planospirina
- Genus † Pseudoplagiothyra
  - † Pseudoplagiothyra praecursor
- Genus † Vernelia

subfamily † Cassianopsinae - from Late Triassic

- † Cassianopsis Bandel, 2007 - type genus of the subfamily Cassianopsinae
  - Cassianopsis armata (Münster, 1841) - synonym: Naticella armata Münster, 1841 - type species
  - Cassianopsis decussata (Münster, 1841) - synonyms: Naticella decussata Münster, 1841; Naticella nodulosa Münster, 1841; Naticella cincta Klipstein, 1843; Neritopsis decussata; Palaeonarica cancellata Kittl, 1892; Palaeonarica hologyriformis Blaschke, 1905
- † Zardiniopsis Bandel, 2007
  - Zardiniopsis subornata (Münster, 1841) - synonym: Naticella subornata Münster, 1841 - type species
- † Fossariopsis Laube, 1869
  - Fossariopsis rugosocarinata (Klipstein, 1843) - type species

subfamily † Colubrellopsinae

- Colubrellopsis Bandel, 2007 - type genus
  - Colubrellopsis acuticostata (Klipstein, 1843) - synonym: Naticella acuticostata Klipstein, 1843 - type species

subfamily ?

- † Bipartopsis Gründel, Keupp & Lang, 2015
- † Hayamia Kase, 1980
- † Hayamiella Kase, 1984
