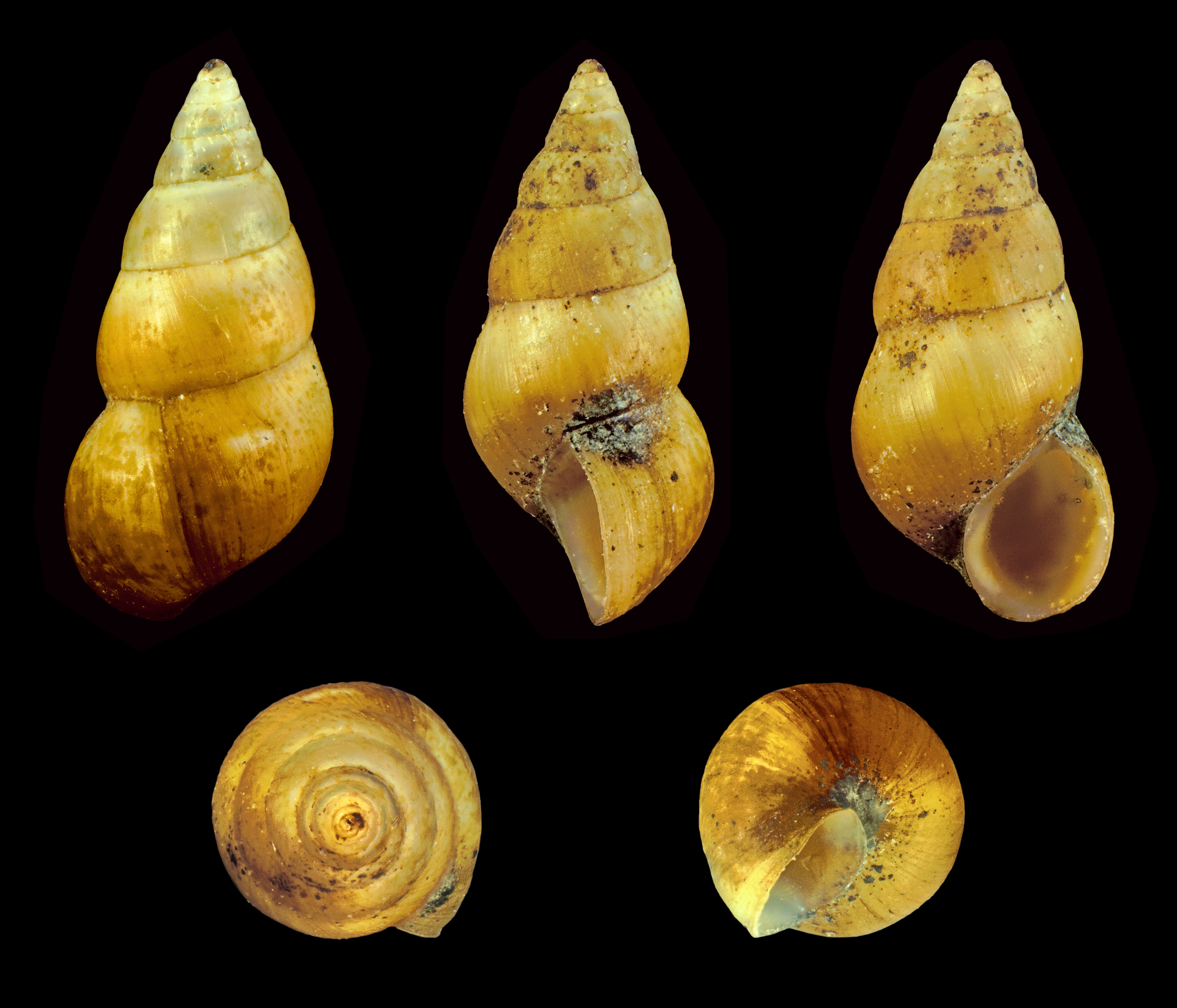
- Peringia ulvae

Scientific classification
- Kingdom: Animalia
- Phylum: Mollusca
- Class: Gastropoda
- Subclass: Caenogastropoda
- Order: Littorinimorpha
- Superfamily: Truncatelloidea
- Family: Hydrobiidae; Stimpson, 1865

Synonyms
- Conocaspiinae B. Dybowski & Grochmalicki, 1913; Paludestrinidae R. B. Newton, 1891; Pyrgulidae Brusina, 1882 (1869)

= Hydrobiidae =

Family of snails

Hydrobiidae, commonly known as mud snails, is a large cosmopolitan family of very small freshwater and brackish water snails with an operculum, in the order Littorinimorpha.

== Distribution ==
Hydrobiidae are found in much of the world, inhabiting all continents except Antarctica. In Australia alone there are over 260 species in the family.

== Description ==
These are very small or minute snails, with a shell height of less than 8 mm. The dextrally-coiled shells are smooth (except for growth lines conforming to the shape of the outer lip) and are usually rather nondescript. The shell offers very few robust characteristics to the systematist who is attempting to classify the species within this family. This difficulty is compounded by a high degree of intraspecific variation. Descriptions often have to be based on the characteristics of the operculum, radula and penis.

The shell of species within this family varies from planispiral to needle-shaped. The shell may have an open umbilicus or a plugged umbilicus. The thickness of the shell can vary from thin to fairly solid. The shell may be transparent and horn-colored, or colorless.

The number of whorls in the shell varies between two and eight. The shell can sometimes even assume a corkscrew or hornlike shape by loosening of the attachment of body whorl. The periostracum (outer layer of the shell) is usually thin, and is often colored. It can sometimes show hair-like projections.

The sinuous aperture is entire, not interrupted by a siphonal canal or other extensions. It is sometimes thickened. The protoconch is usually shaped like a dome, and usually shows a few spirals.

The corneous operculum is usually well-formed and shows only a few spirals.

The head, foot, mantle and visceral coil are colored pale gray to dark purple-black with melanin pigments. Subterranean species are often unpigmented.

The strong foot can be retracted into the shell. The mucous glands are situated at the anterior edge of the foot. There are no posterior mucous glands. The symmetrical cephalic tentacles are threadlike, with blunt or rounded tips. The eyes are located at the base of the tentacles.

The ctenidium (a comblike respiratory apparatus) goes along most of the length of the pallial cavity. This respiratory gill consists of 10 to 200 triangular filaments. The osphradium, the olfactory organ linked with the respiration organ, is usually relatively small.

The taenioglossate radula consists of more than fifty rows of teeth. The central tooth is trapezoidal. The lateral teeth have few to numerous cusps. The marginal teeth are usually with numerous cusps.

The species usually have both male and female individuals, but very rarely reproduction may be parthenogenic, caused by internal fertilization. The females lay eggs in single capsules on the leaves or stems of water plants. But sometimes they produce eggs that are hatched within the pallial gonoduct of the body, and in these cases the young are born alive. Species that inhabit estuaries sometimes produce veliger larvae.

The fossil record of this family extends back to the Early Carboniferous.

== Ecology ==
=== Habitat ===
Most species of this family live in freshwater (lakes, ponds, rivers, streams), but some are found in brackish water or at the borders between freshwater and brackish water. A few occur in marine environments on sandy or muddy bottoms between algae and sea grass.

=== Feeding habits ===
These small snails feed on algae, diatoms and detritus.

== Taxonomy ==
This is the largest family within the superfamily Truncatelloidea. At one time or another some 400 genera have been assigned to this family, and probably more than 1,000 species. The Hydrobiidae family is the most widespread and diverse family of freshwater molluscs in the world, occupying a range of habitats from streams and estuarine creeks to alpine bogs.

This family was originally named by Troschel in 1857, as the group Hydrobiae. Troschel was not certain of their rank, and he placed them in the Taenioglossata: Ctenobranchiata between the Lithoglyphi and Ancyloti. Over the years there have been numerous attempts to give an adequate and more finely divided classification. Thiele (1925, 1929 and 1931) set up the most comprehensive classification, with a review of the family at generic level.

Notable works about taxonomy of Hydrobiidae includes works by Radoman, for example Radoman (1983).

The classification, as specified by Kabat and Hershler (1993), does not form a monophyletic group, and was in need of revision.

A study by Wilke et al. (2001) using molecular data from COI (Cytochrome c oxidase subunit I) and 18S genes has resulted in a new tentative set of subfamilies: Hydrobiinae, Pseudamnicolinae, Nymphophilinae, Islamiinae and Horatiinae.

=== 2005 taxonomy ===
The following subfamilies are recognized in the gastropod taxonomy of Bouchet & Rocroi from 2005:

- Hydrobiinae Stimpson, 1865 – synonyms: Paludestrinidae Newton, 1891; Pyrgorientaliinae Radoman, 1977; Pseudocaspiidae Sitnikova & Starobogatov, 1983
- Belgrandiinae de Stefani, 1877 – synonyms: Horatiini D. W. Taylor, 1966; Sadlerianinae Radoman, 1973; Pseudohoratiinae Radoman, 1973; Orientaliidae Radoman, 1973 (inv.); Lithoglyphulidae Radoman, 1973; Orientalinidae Radoman, 1978 (inv.); Belgrandiellinae Radoman, 1983; Dabrianidae Starobogatov, 1983; Istrianidae Starobogatov, 1983; Kireliinae Starobogatov, 1983; lanzaiidae Starobogatov, 1983; Tanousiidae Starobogatov, 1983; Bucharamnicolinae Izzatulaev, Sitnikova & Starobogatov, 1985; Martensamnicolinae Izzatulaev, Sitnikova & Starobogatov, 1985; Turkmenamnicolinae Izzatulaev, Sitnikova & Starobogatov, 1985
- Clenchiellinae D. W. Taylor, 1966
- Islamiinae Radoman, 1973
- Navarriellinae García-Guerrero, Miller & Ramos, 2023
- Nymphophilinae D. W. Taylor, 1966
- Pseudamnicolinae Radoman, 1977
- Pyrgulinae Brusina, 1882 (1869) – synonyms: Caspiidae B. Dybowski, 1913; Microliopalaeinae B. Dybowski & Grochmalicki, 1914; Micromelaniidae B. Dybowski & Grochmalicki, 1914; Turricaspiinae B. Dybowski & Grochmalicki, 1915; Liosarmatinae B. Dybowski & Grochmalicki, 1920; Chilopyrgulinae Radoman, 1973; Micropyrgulidae Radoman, 1973; Falsipyrgulinae Radoman, 1983; Ohridopyrgulinae Radoman, 1983; Prosostheniinae Pana, 1989
- Tateinae Thiele, 1925 – synonyms: Potamopyrgidae F. C. Baker, 1928; Hemistomiinae Thiele, 1929

The Amnicolidae and Cochliopidae are considered as distinct families according to the taxonomy of Bouchet & Rocroi (2005).

== Genera ==
- Belgrandiellinae Radoman, 1983
  - Aetis Chertoprud, Grego & Mumladze, 2023
  - Andrusovia Brusina, 1903
  - Arganiella Giusti & Pezzoli, 1980
  - Balkanica Georgiev, 2011
  - Balkanospeum Georgiev, 2012
  - Belgrandiella A. J. Wagner, 1928
  - Boleana Radoman, 1975: synonym of Belgrandiella A. J. Wagner, 1928
  - Bucharamnicola Izzatullaev, Sitnikova & Starobogatov, 1985
  - Cavernisa Radoman, 1978
  - Chirgisia Glöer, Boeters & Pešić, 2014
  - Cilgia Schütt, 1968
  - Colchiella Chertoprud, Grego & Mumladze, 2023
  - Costellina Kuščer, 1933: synonym of Paladilhiopsis Pavlović, 1913
  - Graziana Radoman, 1975
  - Heraultiella Bodon, Manganelli & Giusti, 2002
  - Insignia Angelov, 1972
  - Istriana Velkovrh, 1971
  - Iverakia Glöer & Pešić, 2014
  - Kerkia Radoman, 1978
  - Kolevia Georgiev & Glöer, 2015
  - Meyrargueria Girardi, 2009
  - Microstygia Georgiev & Glöer, 2015
  - Motsametia Vinarski, Palatov & Glöer, 2014
  - Palacanthilhiopsis Bernasconi, 1988
  - Phreatica Velkovrh, 1970
  - Pontohoratia Vinarski, Palatov & Glöer, 2014
  - Sarajana Radoman, 1975
  - Sataplia Chertoprud, Grego & Mumladze, 2023
  - Sogdamnicola Izzatullaev, Sitnikova & Starobogatov, 1984
  - Tadzhikamnicola Izzatullaev, 2004
  - Tschernomorica Vinarski & Palatov, 2019
  - Turkmenamnicola Izzatullaev, Sitnikova & Starobogatov, 1985
  - Valvatamnicola Izzatullaev, Sitnikova & Starobogatov, 1984
  - Zeteana Glöer & Pešić, 2014
- Belgrandiinae de Stefani, 1877
  - Antibaria Radoman, 1983
  - †Belchatovia Kadolsky & Piechocki, 2000
  - Belgrandia Bourguignat, 1870
  - Bracenica Radoman, 1973
  - †Cyclothyrella Neubauer, Mandic, Harzhauser & Hrvatović, 2013
  - Dalmatella Velkovrh, 1970
  - Daphniola Radoman, 1973
  - Gloeria Georgiev, Dedov & Cheshmedjiev, 2012
  - Gocea Hadžišče, 1956
  - Graecorientalia Radoman, 1983
  - Grossuana Radoman, 1983
  - Guadiella Boeters, 2003
  - Hadziella Kuščer, 1932
  - Isimerope Radea & Parmakelis, 2013
  - Karucia Glöer & Pešić, 2013
  - Litthabitella Boeters, 1970
  - Lyhnidia Radoman, 1962
  - Malaprespia Radoman, 1973
  - Martensamnicola Izzatullaev, Sitnikova & Starobogatov, 1985
  - †Martinietta Schlickum, 1974
  - †Microprososthenia Kadolsky & Piechocki, 2000
  - Myrtoessa Radea, 2016, named after greek nymph Myrtoessa
  - Narentiana Radoman, 1973
  - Ohridohauffenia Hadžišče, 1959
  - Ohridohoratia Hadžišče, 1959
  - Ohrigocea Hadžišče, 1959
  - Pauluccinella Fo. Giusti & Pezzoli, 1990
  - Plesiella Boeters, 2003
  - Prespiana Radoman, 1973
  - Prespolitorea Radoman, 1983
  - Pseudavenionia Bodon & Giusti, 1982
  - Pseudohoratia Radoman, 1967
  - Pseudoislamia Radoman, 1979
  - Strugia Radoman, 1973
  - Sumia Glöer & Mrkvicka, 2015
  - Tarraconia Ramos & Arconada, 2000
  - Trichonia Schütt, 1980
  - Turcorientalia Radoman, 1973
  - Zaumia Radoman, 1983
  - Zavalia Radoman, 1974
- Bullaregiinae Delicado, Hauffe & Wilke, 2023 (unavailable name, description in Supplementary Material does not fulfill the requirements of the Code for e-only publications )
  - Belgrandiellopsis Khalloufi, Béjaoui & Delicado, 2020
  - Biserta Khalloufi, Béjaoui & Delicado, 2020
  - Bullaregia Khalloufi, Béjaoui & Delicado, 2017
- Caspiinae B. Dybowski, 1913
  - † Alizadella Kabakova, 1966
  - † Azeria Kabakova, 1967
  - Caspia Clessin & W. Dybowski, 1887
  - Clathrocaspia Lindholm, 1930
  - Erosiconcha Delicado & Gürlek, 2021
  - Graecoanatolica Radoman, 1973
  - Ulskia Logvinenko & Starobogatov, 1969
- Horatiinae D.W. Taylor, 1966
  - Anagastina Radoman, 1978
  - Caucasogeyeria Grego & Mumladze, 2020
  - Caucasopsis Grego & Mumladze, 2020
  - Dalmatinella Radoman, 1973
  - Daudebardiella O. Boettger, 1905
  - Graecoarganiella Falniowski & Szarowska, 2011
  - Hausdorfenia Grego & Mumladze, 2020
  - Horatia Bourguignat, 1887
  - Iglicopsis Falniowski & Hofman, 2021
  - Imeretiopsis Grego & Mumladze, 2020
  - Kartvelobia Grego & Mumladze, 2020
  - Lerniana Delicado & Hauffe, 2022
  - Montenegrospeum Pešić & Glöer, 2013
  - Pezzolia Bodon & Giusti, 1986
  - Radomaniola Szarowska, 2007
  - Sadleriana Clessin, 1890
  - Sardohoratia Manganelli, Bodon, Cianfanelli, Talenti & Giusti, 1998
  - Tanousia Servain, 1881
  - Travunijana Grego & Glöer, 2019
  - Vinodolia Radoman, 1973

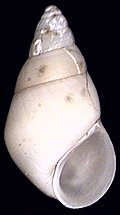
A shell of Peringia ulvae

- Hydrobiinae Stimpson, 1865
  - Achaiohydrobia Falniowski, 2021
  - Adriohydrobia Radoman, 1977
  - Cariohydrobia Delicado & Gürlek, 2021
  - Ecrobia Stimpson, 1865
  - † Harzhauseria Neubauer & Wesselingh, 2023
  - Hoyia F. C. Baker, 1926
  - Hydrobia W. Hartmann, 1821
  - Peringia Paladilhe, 1874
  - † Polycirsus Cossmann, 1888
  - †Romania Cossmann, 1913
  - Salenthydrobia Wilke, 2003
  - † Tournoueria Brusina, 1870
- Islamiinae Radoman, 1973
  - Actenidia Arconada & Ramos, 2024
  - Alzoniella Giusti & Bodon, 1984
  - Aretiana Delicado & Ramos, 2021
  - Avenionia Nicolas, 1882
  - Beatrix J. P. Miller, García-Guerrero, Delicado & Ramos, 2024
  - Boetersiella Arconada & Ramos, 2001
  - Chondrobasis Arconada & Ramos, 2001
  - Corbellaria Callot-Girardi & Boeters, 2012
  - Deganta Arconada & Ramos, 2019
  - Fissuria Boeters, 1981
  - Hauffenia Pollonera, 1898
  - Iberhoratia Arconada & Ramos, 2007
  - Islamia Radoman, 1973
  - Josefus Arconada & Ramos, 2006
  - Milesiana Arconada & Ramos, 2006
  - Spathogyna Arconada & Ramos, 2002
- Mercuriinae Boeters & Falkner, 2017
  - Mercuria Boeters, 1971
- Navarriellinae García-Guerrero, Miller & Ramos, 2023
  - Navarriella Boeters, 2000
- Nymphophilinae
  - Birgella Baker, 1926
  - Cincinnatia Pilsbry, 1891
  - Floridobia F. G. Thompson & Hershler, 2002
  - Marstonia F. C. Baker, 1926
  - Notogillia Pilsbry, 1953
  - Pyrgulopsis Call & Pilsbry, 1886
  - Rhapinema F. G. Thompson, 1970
  - Spilochlamys F. G. Thompson, 1968
  - Stiobia F. G. Thompson, 1978
- Pontobelgrandiellinae Delicado, Hauffe & Wilke, 2023 (unavailable name, description in Supplementary Material does not fulfill the requirements of the Code for e-only publications)
  - Cavernisa Radoman, 1978
  - Devetakia Georgiev & Glöer, 2011
  - Devetakiola Georgiev, 2017
  - Pontobelgrandiella Radoman, 1978
  - Stoyanovia Georgiev, 2017
- Pseudamnicolinae Radoman, 1977
  - Corrosella Boeters, 1970
  - Diegus Delicado, Machordom & Ramos, 2016
  - Falniowskia Bernasconi, 1991
  - †Graecamnicola Willmann, 1981
  - Kaskakia Glöer & Pešić, 2012
  - Kitrinomatousa Glöer & Kolokotronis, 2023
  - Pseudamnicola Paulucci, 1878
  - Sarkhia Glöer & Pešić, 2012
- Pyrgulinae E. von Martens, 1858
  - † Aenigmapyrgus Popova & Starobogatov, 1970
  - † Annulifer Cossmann, 1921
  - Chilopyrgula Brusina, 1896
  - Clessiniola Lindholm, 1924
  - Dianella Gude, 1913
  - Falsipyrgula Radoman, 1973
  - Ginaia Brusina, 1896
  - † Itomelania K. Suzuki, 1943
  - Laevicaspia Dybowski & Grochmalicki, 1917
  - †Maeotidia Andrusov, 1890
  - †Marticia Brusina, 1897
  - † Micromelania Brusina, 1874
  - Micropyrgula Polinski, 1929
  - Neofossarulus Poliński, 1929
  - Ohridopyrgula Radoman, 1983
  - †Pseudodianella Neubauer, Mandic, Harzhauser & Hrvatović, 2013
  - Pyrgohydrobia Radoman, 1955
  - Pyrgorientalia Radoman, 1973
  - Pyrgula de Cristofori & Jan, 1832
  - † Sibiropyrgula Lindholm, 1932
  - Stankovicia Poliński, 1929
  - Trachyochridia Poliński, 1929
  - Turricaspia B. Dybowski & Grochmalicki, 1915
  - Xestopyrgula Poliński, 1929
- Shadiniinae V. Anistratenko, Peretolchina, Sitnikova & Palatov, 2017
  - Intermaria Delicado, Pešić & Glöer, 2016
  - Nicolaia Glöer, Bößneck, Walther & Neiber, 2016
  - Persipyrgula Delicado, Pešić & Glöer, 2016
  - Shadinia Akramowski, 1976
- Incertae sedis
  - Agrafia Szarowska & Falniowski, 2011
  - Anatolidamnicola (sic): synonym of Anadoludamnicola Şahin, Koca & Yıldırım, 2012 (incorrect original spelling)
  - Antillobia Altaba, 1993: synonym of Pyrgophorus Ancey, 1888 (subjective junior synonym)
  - †Arabiella Kadolsky, Harzhauser & Neubauer in Harzhauser et al., 2016
  - Austropyrgus Cotton, 1942
  - †Baglivia Brusina, 1892
  - †Bania Brusina, 1896
  - †Beogradica Pavlović, 1927
  - Berkanella Taybi, Glöer & Mabrouki, 2024
  - † Bernicia L. R. Cox, 1927
  - †Brasovia Neubauer, Kroh, Harzhauser, Georgopoulou & Mandic, 2015
  - † Briardia Munier-Chalmas, 1884
  - Bullaregia Khalloufi, Béjaoui & Delicado, 2017
  - Caspiohydrobia Starobogatov, 1970 (nomen dubium)
  - † Charydrobia Stache, 1889
  - † Chazarella A. A. Ali-Zade, 1967
  - † Cirsomphalus Cossmann, 1907
  - †Coelacanthia Andrusov, 1890
  - † Costhyrella Pacaud, 1997
  - †Ctyrokya Schlickum, 1965
  - † Edrozeba Guzhov, 2022
  - Falsibelgrandiella Radoman, 1973
  - Fessia Glöer, Mabrouki & Taybi, 2020
  - † Fuxinia X.-H. Yu, 1982
  - Gafaita Taybi, Glöer & Mabrouki, 2023
  - † Goniatogyra Cossmann, 1921
  - †Goniochilus Sandberger, 1875
  - †Gyromelania Wenz, 1939
  - Heideella Backhuys & Boeters, 1974
  - Hemite Gürlek, 2018
  - Heterocyclus Crosse, 1872
  - Idrisiella Mabrouki, Glöer & Taybi, 2022
  - Ifrania Glöer, Mabrouki & Taybi, 2020
  - †Illyricella Neubauer, Mandic & Harzhauser, 2016
  - †Iraklimelania Willmann, 1981
  - † Islamiella Guzhov, 2023
  - †Jekeliella Bandel, 2010
  - †Kadolskya Neubauer & Harzhauser, 2016
  - Kaskakia Glöer & Pešić, 2012
  - †Kerchia Bandel, 2010
  - †Lisinskia Brusina, 1897
  - Littoridinops Pilsbry, 1952
  - †Lutetiella Kadolsky, 2015
  - † Lyobasis L.-S. Huang, 1987 (accepted > unreplaced junior homonym, junior homonym of Lyobasis Pilsbry, 1903)
  - Mahrazia Mabrouki, Taybi & Gloër, 2022
  - Menzella Mabrouki, Glöer & Taybi, 2023
  - †Microbeliscus Sandberger, 1875
  - †Micromelania Brusina, 1874
  - †Mikrogoniochilus Willmann, 1981
  - † Mirolaminatus H.-J. Wang, 1977
  - † Montjavoultia Raspail, 1909
  - Motsametia Vinarski, Palatov & Glöer, 2014
  - †Muellerpalia Bandel, 2010
  - Navalis Quiñonero-Salgado & Rolán, 2017
  - †Nematurella Sandberger, 1875
  - Neohoratia Schütt, 1961
  - †Odontohydrobia Pavlović, 1927
  - Ohridonaumia Glöer & Pešić, 2023
  - † Parateinostoma Oppenheim, 1892
  - Parhydrobia Cossmann & Dollfus, 1913
  - † Pechelbronnia R. Janssen, 2007
  - Phaethusa (gastropod) Glöer & Manolas, 2024
  - Pikasia Taybi, Glöer & Mabrouki, 2021
  - † Pingyispira Y.-T. Li, 1986
  - Polatenia Georgiev, 2023
  - † Pomatiasia Guzhov, 2022
  - Pontohoratia Vinarski, Palatov & Glöer, 2014
  - †Pontohydrobia Badzoshvili, 1979
  - † Potamaclis F. Sandberger, 1873
  - † Potamolithoides W. B. Marshall & Bowles, 1932
  - Probythinella Thiele, 1928
  - †Prososthenia Neumayr, 1869
  - Pseudopaludinella Mabille, 1877 (taxon inquirendum)
  - †Pyrgulella Harzhauser, Neubauer & Kadolsky in Harzhauser et al., 2016
  - † Renistoma W. Yü, 1977
  - †Rhodopyrgula Willmann, 1981
  - Rifia Ghamizi, 2020
  - †Robicia Brusina, 1897
  - †Saccoia Brusina, 1893
  - Salaeniella Boeters, Quiñonero-Salgado & Ruiz-Cobo, 2019
  - †Salakosia Willmann, 1981
  - †Salalahia Kadolsky, Harzhauser & Neubauer in Harzhauser et al., 2016
  - †Scalimelania Wenz, 1939
  - Schapsugia Chertoprud, Palatov & Vinarski, 2021
  - Sellia Raincourt, 1884
  - Sheitanok Schütt & Şeşen, 1991
  - Sitnikovia Chertoprud, Palatov & Vinarski, 2020
  - Sivasi Şahin, Koca & Yildirim, 2012
  - †Socenia Jekelius, 1944
  - †Staja Brusina, 1897
  - †Stalioa Brusina, 1870
  - †Staliopsis Rzehak, 1893
  - Stygobium Grego & Glöer, 2019
  - Syrofontana Schütt, 1983
  - Tachira Chertoprud, Palatov & Vinarski, 2021
  - Tefennia Schütt & Yıldırım, 2003
  - Terranigra Radoman, 1978
  - Torosia Glöer & Georgiev, 2012
  - †Tournouerina Schlickum, 1971
  - Tridentalia Glöer & Hirschfelder, 2023
  - † Unicarinata Pan, 1982
  - Vilertia López-Soriano, Quiñonero-Salgado, A. A. Suárez, Rolán & Glöer, 2022
  - †Vrazia Brusina, 1897
  - † Wallaua R. Janssen, 2007
  - Wuconcha Kang, 1983
  - †Xestopyrguloides Willmann, 1981
- Znassela Taybi, Glöer & Mabrouki, 2023
