= Antrorbis breweri =

Conservation status
- Vulnerable (IUCN 3.1)

- Critically Imperiled (NatureServe)

Scientific classification
- Kingdom: Animalia
- Phylum: Mollusca
- Class: Gastropoda
- Subclass: Caenogastropoda
- Order: Littorinimorpha
- Family: Lithoglyphidae
- Genus: Antrorbis
- Species: A. breweri

Binomial name
- Antrorbis breweri Hershler & F. G. Thompson, 1990

Synonyms
- Horatia sp. Hubricht, 1940; Horatia micra; Antrobia breweri Hershler & F. G. Thompson, 1990 [orth. error on IUCN Red List]

Species of gastropods

Antrorbis breweri, common name Manitou cavesnail, is a species of freshwater snail with gills and an operculum, an aquatic gastropod mollusk in the family Lithoglyphidae.

The specific name breweri is in honor of Dr. Stephen Brewer, the owner of Manitou Cave.

== Distribution ==
This species is endemic to Alabama in the United States, and it is known only from its type locality. The type locality is Manitou Cave, Little Wills Valley, Coosa River Basin, Fort Payne, Alabama.

== Description ==
The shape of the shell is discoidal. The shell has 2.5-3.0 whorls.

The width of the shell is 1.53-1.79 mm. The height of the shell is 0.80-0.98 mm.

The length of the whole animal is 2.7-3.0 mm.

== Ecology ==
Antrorbis breweri lives in cool stream in Manitou Cave. It is threatened by habitat loss.
