= Rolling pebblesnail =

Conservation status
- Critically Endangered (IUCN 2.3)

- Critically Imperiled (NatureServe)

Scientific classification
- Kingdom: Animalia
- Phylum: Mollusca
- Class: Gastropoda
- Subclass: Caenogastropoda
- Order: Littorinimorpha
- Family: Lithoglyphidae
- Genus: Somatogyrus
- Species: S. strengi

Binomial name
- Somatogyrus strengi Pilsbry & Walker, 1906

Species of gastropod

The rolling pebblesnail scientific name Somatogyrus strengi, is a species of freshwater snail with a gill and an operculum, an aquatic gastropod mollusk in the family Hydrobiidae. This species is endemic to the United States. Its natural habitat is rivers.
