= Pygmy pebblesnail =

Conservation status
- Critically Endangered (IUCN 3.1)

- Possibly Extinct (NatureServe)

Scientific classification
- Kingdom: Animalia
- Phylum: Mollusca
- Class: Gastropoda
- Subclass: Caenogastropoda
- Order: Littorinimorpha
- Family: Lithoglyphidae
- Genus: Somatogyrus
- Species: S. pygmaeus

Binomial name
- Somatogyrus pygmaeus Walker, 1909

Species of gastropod

The pygmy pebblesnail, scientific name Somatogyrus pygmaeus, is a species of very small or minute freshwater snail with a gill and an operculum, an aquatic gastropod mollusc in the family Lithoglyphidae. This species is endemic to Alabama in the United States. Its natural habitat is the Coosa River.
