= Moon pebblesnail =

Conservation status
- Data Deficient (IUCN 3.1)

- Possibly Extinct (NatureServe)

Scientific classification
- Kingdom: Animalia
- Phylum: Mollusca
- Class: Gastropoda
- Subclass: Caenogastropoda
- Order: Littorinimorpha
- Family: Lithoglyphidae
- Genus: Somatogyrus
- Species: S. obtusus

Binomial name
- Somatogyrus obtusus Walker, 1904

Species of gastropod

The Moon pebblesnail, scientific name Somatogyrus obtusus, is a species of very small freshwater snail that has an operculum, an aquatic gastropod mollusc in the family Lithoglyphidae.

This species is endemic to Alabama in the United States. Its natural habitat is the Coosa River.

Although the IUCN officially categorises the species as Data Deficient, it also considers it as Possibly extinct, as it has not been recorded since the river was impounded. This latter classification is also supported by The Nature Conservancy.
