= Cherokee pebblesnail =

Conservation status
- Possibly Extinct (NatureServe)

Scientific classification
- Kingdom: Animalia
- Phylum: Mollusca
- Class: Gastropoda
- Subclass: Caenogastropoda
- Order: Littorinimorpha
- Family: Lithoglyphidae
- Genus: Somatogyrus
- Species: S. georgianus

Binomial name
- Somatogyrus georgianus Walker, 1904

Species of gastropod

The Cherokee pebblesnail (Somatogyrus georgianus) is a species of very small freshwater snail with an operculum. It is an aquatic gastropod mollusc in the family Lithoglyphidae.

== Distribution ==
This species is endemic to the Tennessee, Cahaba and Alabama Rivers in Alabama and Chattanooga River in Georgia in the United States. Assessment of its conservation status is encumbered by the difficulty in differentiating the various species of Somatogyrus from one another.
