= Angular pebblesnail =

Conservation status
- Data Deficient (IUCN 3.1)

- Possibly Extinct (NatureServe)

Scientific classification
- Kingdom: Animalia
- Phylum: Mollusca
- Class: Gastropoda
- Subclass: Caenogastropoda
- Order: Littorinimorpha
- Family: Lithoglyphidae
- Genus: Somatogyrus
- Species: S. biangulatus

Binomial name
- Somatogyrus biangulatus Walker, 1906

Species of gastropod

The angular pebblesnail, scientific name Somatogyrus biangulatus, is a species of very small freshwater snail with an operculum, an aquatic operculate gastropod mollusc in the Lithoglyphidae family. This species is endemic to Alabama in the United States. Its natural habitat is Muscle Shoals region of the Tennessee River. Although the IUCN officially categorises the species as Data Deficient, it also considers it as Possibly extinct, as it has not been recorded since the river was impounded. This latter classification is also supported by The Nature Conservancy.

The taxonomic status of S. biangulatus is unclear, as it is morphologically similar to other species. Based on its shell characteristics, it may well be a member of Marstonia.
