= Granite pebblesnail =

Conservation status
- Data Deficient (IUCN 3.1)

Scientific classification
- Kingdom: Animalia
- Phylum: Mollusca
- Class: Gastropoda
- Subclass: Caenogastropoda
- Order: Littorinimorpha
- Family: Lithoglyphidae
- Genus: Somatogyrus
- Species: S. hinkleyi

Binomial name
- Somatogyrus hinkleyi Walker, 1904

Species of gastropod

The Granite pebblesnail, scientific name Somatogyrus hinkleyi, is a species of small freshwater snails with an operculum, aquatic gastropod molluscs or micromolluscs in the family Lithoglyphidae.

This species is endemic to Alabama in the United States. Its natural habit is the Coosa and Tallapoosa Rivers, but it has not been collected since these rivers were impounded.
