= Savannah pebblesnail =

Conservation status
- Near Threatened (IUCN 3.1)

- Imperiled (NatureServe)

Scientific classification
- Kingdom: Animalia
- Phylum: Mollusca
- Class: Gastropoda
- Subclass: Caenogastropoda
- Order: Littorinimorpha
- Family: Lithoglyphidae
- Genus: Somatogyrus
- Species: S. tenax

Binomial name
- Somatogyrus tenax F. G. Thompson, 1969

Species of gastropod

The Savannah pebblesnail, scientific name Somatogyrus tenax, is a species of freshwater snail, an aquatic gastropod mollusk in the family Hydrobiidae. This species is endemic to the United States. Somatogyrus tenax may actually be a junior synonym of Somatogyrus virginicus, although the taxonomy remains in dispute.
