= Ovate pebblesnail =

Conservation status
- Data Deficient (IUCN 3.1)

- Possibly Extinct (NatureServe)

Scientific classification
- Kingdom: Animalia
- Phylum: Mollusca
- Class: Gastropoda
- Subclass: Caenogastropoda
- Order: Littorinimorpha
- Family: Lithoglyphidae
- Genus: Somatogyrus
- Species: S. excavatus

Binomial name
- Somatogyrus excavatus Walker, 1906

Species of gastropod

The ovate pebblesnail, scientific name Somatogyrus excavatus, is a species of very small freshwater snail with an operculum, an aquatic gastropod mollusc in the family Lithoglyphidae. This species is endemic to Lauderdale County, Alabama in the United States, and its natural habitat is the Shoal Creek area of the Tennessee River drainage.

Although the IUCN officially categorises the species as Data Deficient, it also considers it as Possibly extinct, as it has not been recorded since the river was impounded. This latter classification is also supported by The Nature Conservancy.
