= Channeled pebblesnail =

Conservation status
- Extinct (IUCN 3.1)

- Presumed Extinct (NatureServe)

Scientific classification
- Kingdom: Animalia
- Phylum: Mollusca
- Class: Gastropoda
- Subclass: Caenogastropoda
- Order: Littorinimorpha
- Family: Lithoglyphidae
- Genus: Somatogyrus
- Species: †S. wheeleri

Binomial name
- †Somatogyrus wheeleri Walker, 1915

Species of gastropod

The channeled pebblesnail, scientific name Somatogyrus wheeleri, was a species of very small freshwater and brackish water snails that have an operculum, aquatic gastropod mollusks in the family Lithoglyphidae.

This species was endemic to Arkansas in the United States. Its natural habitat was the Ouachita River.
