= Ouachita pebblesnail =

Conservation status
- Extinct (IUCN 3.1)

- Presumed Extinct (NatureServe)

Scientific classification
- Kingdom: Animalia
- Phylum: Mollusca
- Class: Gastropoda
- Subclass: Caenogastropoda
- Order: Littorinimorpha
- Family: Lithoglyphidae
- Genus: Somatogyrus
- Species: †S. amnicoloides

Binomial name
- †Somatogyrus amnicoloides Walker, 1915

Species of gastropod

The Ouachita pebblesnail, scientific name †Somatogyrus amnicoloides, was a species of small freshwater snail with an operculum, an aquatic gastropod mollusc or micromollusc in the family Hydrobiidae.

The species was endemic to the United States. Its natural habitat was rivers, and it was named after the Ouachita River. The species is now extinct.
