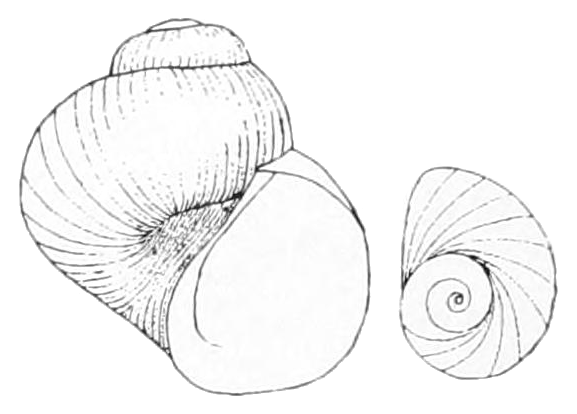
- Drawing of apertural view of the shell and operculum of Clappia umbilicata
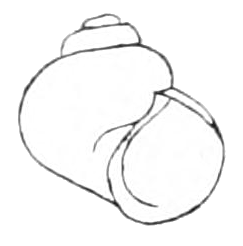
- Drawing of apertural view of the shell of Clappia umbilicata from its type description by Bryant Walker

Conservation status
- Extinct (IUCN 3.1)

- Presumed Extinct (NatureServe)

Scientific classification
- Kingdom: Animalia
- Phylum: Mollusca
- Class: Gastropoda
- Subclass: Caenogastropoda
- Order: Littorinimorpha
- Family: Lithoglyphidae
- Genus: Clappia
- Species: †C. umbilicata

Binomial name
- †Clappia umbilicata (Walker, 1904)

Synonyms
- Somatogyrus umbilicatus Walker, 1904; Lithoglyphus umbilicata Walker, 1904; Clappia clappi Walker, 1909

= Clappia umbilicata =

Umbilicate pebblesnail

Species of gastropod

Clappia umbilicata, the umbilicate pebblesnail, was a species of small freshwater snail that had an operculum, an aquatic gastropod mollusk in the family Lithoglyphidae. This species is now extinct.

== Distribution ==
This species was endemic to the State of Alabama in the United States. The type locality is the Coosa River at Wetumpka, Alabama.

The distribution of this species used to include: Coosa River at Duncan's Ripple, The Bar and Higgin's Ferry in Chilton County; and Butting Ram Shoals in Coosa County, Alabama.

Chilton County, Alabama (marked red) where the species was found

Coosa County, Alabama (marked red) where the species was also found

== Description ==
This species was discovered and described under the name Somatogyrus umbilicatus by the American malacologist Bryant Walker in 1904. Walker's type description reads as follows:

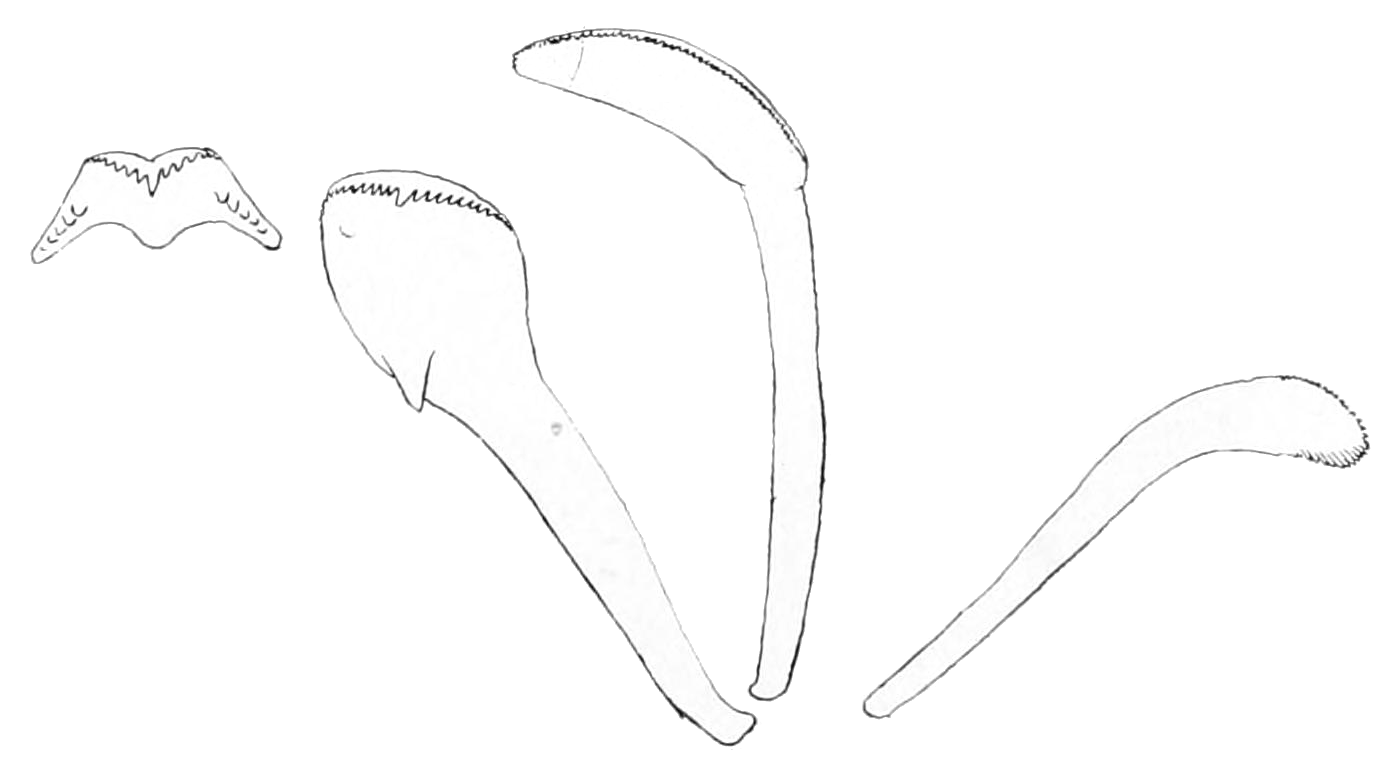
Drawing of selected radular teeth of Clappia umbilicata: central tooth, lateral tooth, inner marginal tooth and outer marginal tooth.

Somatogyrus umbilicatus n. sp. Pl. v, fig. 5.

Shell small, globosely depressed, umbilicate, light greenish-yellow, smooth, except for the fine, rather unequal, lines of growth. Spire short, obtusely elevated. Whorls 3½ those of the spire convex and separated by a well-impressed suture; body whorl large, gibbously convex. Aperture sub-circular, rather longer than broad, obtusely angled above and slightly flattened along the basal margin. Columella concave, narrowly reflected; columellar callus, moderately heavy, rounded, reflected over but not concealing the round, deep umbilicus, thin and transparent on the parietal wall. Alt. 3, diam. 3 mm.

Coosa river at Wetumpka, Ala. (type locality), also at Fort Williams Shoals above Farmer, Ala.

This species is remarkable for its depressed, valvata-like form and round, deep umbilicus, which readily differentiates it from all other known species of the genus. It does not appear to be very abundant at Wetumpka, and only a single example was collected at Fort Williams Shoals.

The color of Clappia umbilicata was black. This presumably means that the whole animal including snout, nape, mantle and foot were black. The black color of the mantle was verified by Thompson (1984).

Clappia umbilicata has 56-59 rows of teeth on its radula. Each row has 6-7 central basocones, 6-7 central ectocones, 18-21 lateral teeth, ca. 50 inner marginal teeth and ca. 35 outer marginal teeth.

== Ecology ==
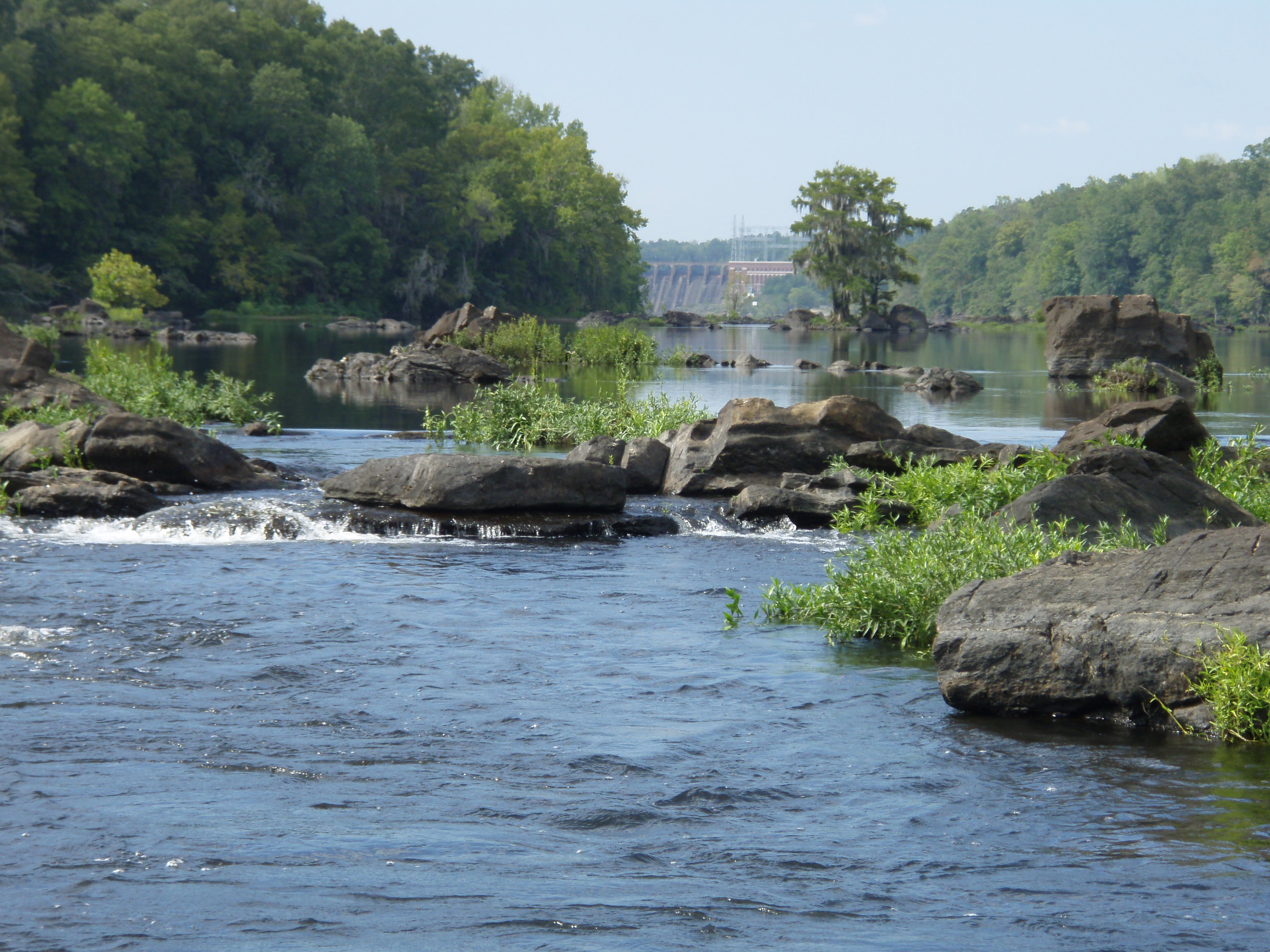
Jordan Dam on the Coosa River altered the habitat of Clappia umbilicata so much that the snail died out completely.

The natural habitat of this species was rivers. Clappia umbilicata inhabited only the rapidly flowing sections of river shoals. The snail died out because of silting of its habitat after the dam was constructed in 1928. (Also see Jordan Dam and Jordan Lake).

Based on examination of the radula, Thompson (1984) hypothesized that Clappia umbilicata grazed on fine particles of plants, specializing on finer-sized particles than those consumed by snails in the genus Somatogyrus.
