= Stocky pebblesnail =

Conservation status
- Critically endangered, possibly extinct (IUCN 3.1)

- Possibly Extinct (NatureServe)

Scientific classification
- Kingdom: Animalia
- Phylum: Mollusca
- Class: Gastropoda
- Subclass: Caenogastropoda
- Order: Littorinimorpha
- Family: Lithoglyphidae
- Genus: Somatogyrus
- Species: S. crassus

Binomial name
- Somatogyrus crassus Walker, 1904

Species of gastropod

The stocky pebblesnail (Somatogyrus crassus) is a species of very small freshwater snail with a gill and an operculum, an aquatic gastropod mollusc in the family Lithoglyphidae. This species is endemic to Alabama in the United States. Its natural habitat is the Coosa River. The IUCN classification is also supported by The Nature Conservancy, as it has not been recorded since the river was impounded.
