= Quadrate pebblesnail =

Conservation status
- Critically Endangered (IUCN 3.1)

- Possibly Extinct (NatureServe)

Scientific classification
- Kingdom: Animalia
- Phylum: Mollusca
- Class: Gastropoda
- Subclass: Caenogastropoda
- Order: Littorinimorpha
- Family: Lithoglyphidae
- Genus: Somatogyrus
- Species: S. quadratus

Binomial name
- Somatogyrus quadratus Walker, 1906

Species of gastropod

The quadrate pebblesnail, scientific name Somatogyrus quadratus, is a species of small freshwater snail with a gill and an operculum, an aquatic gastropod mollusc in the family Lithoglyphidae. This species is endemic to Alabama in the United States. Its natural habitat is rivers. This species is possibly extinct because there is no recent survey information. It is known to have had a very restricted distribution and there had been a habitat disturbance. This species was endemic to the Tennessee River system and was known to exist from Muscle Shoals and adjacent Shoal Creek, Lauderdale County, Alabama. It has not been reported since the river was impounded. Based on the fact that the species has not been observed since the dams were constructed, it is widely believed that that change in habitat possibly caused the species's extinction.
