= Coosa pebblesnail =

Conservation status
- Critically Endangered (IUCN 3.1)

- Possibly Extinct (NatureServe)

Scientific classification
- Kingdom: Animalia
- Phylum: Mollusca
- Class: Gastropoda
- Subclass: Caenogastropoda
- Order: Littorinimorpha
- Family: Lithoglyphidae
- Genus: Somatogyrus
- Species: S. coosaensis

Binomial name
- Somatogyrus coosaensis Walker, 1904

Species of gastropod

The Coosa pebblesnail, scientific name Somatogyrus coosaensis, is a species of small freshwater snails with a gill and an operculum, aquatic gastropod mollusks in the family Lithoglyphidae. This species is endemic to Alabama in the United States. Its natural habitat is the Coosa River. Although the IUCN officially categorises the species as Critically Endangered, it also considers it as Possibly extinct, as it has not been recorded in several dozen years. This latter classification is also supported by The Nature Conservancy.
