= Thick-lipped pebblesnail =

Conservation status
- Extinct (IUCN 3.1)

- Presumed Extinct (NatureServe)

Scientific classification
- Kingdom: Animalia
- Phylum: Mollusca
- Class: Gastropoda
- Subclass: Caenogastropoda
- Order: Littorinimorpha
- Family: Lithoglyphidae
- Genus: Somatogyrus
- Species: †S. crassilabris

Binomial name
- †Somatogyrus crassilabris Walker, 1915

Species of gastropod

The thick-lipped pebblesnail, scientific name Somatogyrus crassilabris, was a species of freshwater snail with an operculum, an aquatic gastropod mollusc in the family Lithoglyphidae. This species was endemic to Baxter County, Arkansas in the United States. Its natural habitat was the north fork of the White River. It is now extinct.
