= Opaque pebblesnail =

Conservation status
- Critically Endangered (IUCN 2.3)

- Critically Imperiled (NatureServe)

Scientific classification
- Kingdom: Animalia
- Phylum: Mollusca
- Class: Gastropoda
- Subclass: Caenogastropoda
- Order: Littorinimorpha
- Family: Lithoglyphidae
- Genus: Somatogyrus
- Species: S. tennesseensis

Binomial name
- Somatogyrus tennesseensis Walker, 1906

Species of gastropod

The opaque pebblesnail, scientific name Somatogyrus tennesseensis, is a species of very small or minute freshwater snail with an operculum, an aquatic gastropod mollusk in the family Hydrobiidae. This species is endemic to the United States. The natural habitat of this species is rivers.
