= Fluted pebblesnail =

Conservation status
- Critically endangered, possibly extinct (IUCN 3.1)

Scientific classification
- Kingdom: Animalia
- Phylum: Mollusca
- Class: Gastropoda
- Subclass: Caenogastropoda
- Order: Littorinimorpha
- Family: Lithoglyphidae
- Genus: Somatogyrus
- Species: S. hendersoni

Binomial name
- Somatogyrus hendersoni Walker, 1909

Species of gastropod

The fluted pebblesnail, scientific name Somatogyrus hendersoni, is a species of very small freshwater snail with an operculum, an aquatic gastropod mollusc in the family Lithoglyphidae. This species is endemic to Alabama in the United States. Its natural habitat is the Coosa River, but it has not been collected since the river was impounded.
