= Knotty pebblesnail =

Conservation status
- Data Deficient (IUCN 3.1)

- Possibly Extinct (NatureServe)

Scientific classification
- Kingdom: Animalia
- Phylum: Mollusca
- Class: Gastropoda
- Subclass: Caenogastropoda
- Order: Littorinimorpha
- Family: Lithoglyphidae
- Genus: Somatogyrus
- Species: S. constrictus

Binomial name
- Somatogyrus constrictus Walker, 1904

Species of gastropod

The knotty pebblesnail, scientific name Somatogyrus constrictus, of minute freshwater snails with an operculum, aquatic gastropod molluscs or micromolluscs in the family Lithoglyphidae. This species is endemic to Alabama in the United States. Its natural habitat is the Coosa River. Although the IUCN officially categorises the species as Data Deficient, it also considers it as Possibly extinct, as it has not been recorded since the river was impounded. This latter classification is also supported by The Nature Conservancy. The taxonomic validity of this species has been questioned; it may represent morphological aberrations of other, valid species. If it is a valid species, it would be assessed as threatened.
