= Hidden pebblesnail =

Conservation status
- Data Deficient (IUCN 3.1)

- Possibly Extinct (NatureServe)

Scientific classification
- Kingdom: Animalia
- Phylum: Mollusca
- Class: Gastropoda
- Subclass: Caenogastropoda
- Order: Littorinimorpha
- Family: Lithoglyphidae
- Genus: Somatogyrus
- Species: S. decipiens

Binomial name
- Somatogyrus decipiens Walker, 1909

Species of gastropod

The hidden pebblesnail, scientific name Somatogyrus decipiens, is a species of small freshwater snails with an operculum, aquatic gastropod molluscs or micromolluscs in the family Lithoglyphidae.

This species is endemic to Alabama in the United States. Its natural habitat is the Coosa River. Although the IUCN officially categorises the species as Data Deficient, it also considers it as Possibly extinct as it has not been recorded since the river was impounded. This latter classification is also supported by The Nature Conservancy. The common name is based on a river called the Hidden River.
