= Shale pebblesnail =

Conservation status
- Vulnerable (NatureServe)

Scientific classification
- Kingdom: Animalia
- Phylum: Mollusca
- Class: Gastropoda
- Subclass: Caenogastropoda
- Order: Littorinimorpha
- Family: Lithoglyphidae
- Genus: Somatogyrus
- Species: S. pennsylvanicus

Binomial name
- Somatogyrus pennsylvanicus Walker, 1904

Species of gastropod

The shale pebblesnail (Somatogyrus pennsylvanicus) is a species of very small freshwater snail with an operculum. It is an aquatic gastropod mollusc in the family Lithoglyphidae.

== Distribution ==
This species is endemic to rivers in Pennsylvania, Virginia and West Virginia in the United States.
