= Tallapoosa pebblesnail =

Conservation status
- Data Deficient (IUCN 3.1)

- Unranked (NatureServe)

Scientific classification
- Kingdom: Animalia
- Phylum: Mollusca
- Class: Gastropoda
- Subclass: Caenogastropoda
- Order: Littorinimorpha
- Family: Lithoglyphidae
- Genus: Somatogyrus
- Species: S. pilsbryanus

Binomial name
- Somatogyrus pilsbryanus Walker, 1904

Species of gastropod

The Tallapoosa pebblesnail, scientific name Somatogyrus pilsbryanus, is a species of very small freshwater snail with an operculum, an aquatic gastropod mollusc in the family Hydrobiidae. This species is endemic to Alabama in the United States. Its natural habitat is rivers. The common name of this pebblesnail refers to the Tallapoosa River, which runs through the states of Georgia and Alabama.
