= Atlas pebblesnail =

Conservation status
- Critically endangered, possibly extinct (IUCN 3.1)

- Possibly Extinct (NatureServe)

Scientific classification
- Kingdom: Animalia
- Phylum: Mollusca
- Class: Gastropoda
- Subclass: Caenogastropoda
- Order: Littorinimorpha
- Family: Lithoglyphidae
- Genus: Somatogyrus
- Species: S. humerosus

Binomial name
- Somatogyrus humerosus Walker, 1906

Species of gastropod

The atlas pebblesnail (Somatogyrus humerosus) is a species of small freshwater snail that has an operculum, an aquatic operculate gastropod micromollusc in the family Lithoglyphidae. This species is endemic to the Alabama in the United States. Its natural habitat is the Tennessee River around Florence, Alabama, but it has not been collected recently.
