= Benedictia =

Scientific classification
- Kingdom: Animalia
- Phylum: Mollusca
- Class: Gastropoda
- Subclass: Caenogastropoda
- Order: Littorinimorpha
- Family: Lithoglyphidae
- Subfamily: Benedictiinae
- Genus: Benedictia; Dybowski, 1875

Diversity
- 10 species

Genus of gastropods

Benedictia is a genus of freshwater snails with an operculum, aquatic gastropod molluscs or micromolluscs in the family Lithoglyphidae.

Benedictia is the type genus of the subfamily Benedictiinae.

== Distribution ==
The genus Benedictia is endemic to Lake Baikal.

== Species ==
Species within the genus Benedictia include:

- Benedictia baicalensis (Gerstfeldt, 1859)
- Benedictia distinguenda Lindholm, 1924
  - Benedictia distinguenda lamuana Sitnikova, 1987
- Benedictia fragilis W. Dybowski, 1875 - type species
- Benedictia kotyensis Matiokin, Dzuban & Sitnikova, 1988
- Benedictia limnaeoides (Schrenck, 1867)
  - Benedictia limnaeoides ongurensis Kozhov, 1936
  - Benedictia limnaeoides litoralis Kozhov, 1936
- Benedictia maxima (W. Dybowski, 1875)
  - Benedictia maxima marisminus Sitnikova, 1987
- Benedictia nana Beckman & Starobogatov, 1975
- Benedictia pulchella Sitnikova, 1987
- Benedictia pulchella sarmensis Sitnikova, 1987
- Benedictia pumyla (Lindholm, 1924)
- Benedictia shadini Beckman & Starobogatov, 1975
