= Sparrow pebblesnail =

Conservation status
- Data Deficient (IUCN 3.1)

- Critically Imperiled (NatureServe)

Scientific classification
- Kingdom: Animalia
- Phylum: Mollusca
- Class: Gastropoda
- Subclass: Caenogastropoda
- Order: Littorinimorpha
- Family: Lithoglyphidae
- Genus: Somatogyrus
- Species: S. parvulus

Binomial name
- Somatogyrus parvulus Tryon, 1865

Species of gastropod

The sparrow pebblesnail, scientific name Somatogyrus parvulus, is a species of small freshwater snail that has an operculum, an aquatic operculate gastropod micromollusc in the family Lithoglyphidae. This species is endemic to Tennessee in the United States. Its natural habitat is the Powell River.
