= S. nanus =

S. nanus may refer to:

- Somatogyrus nanus, the dwarf pebblesnail, a freshwater snail species
- Sorex nanus, the dwarf shrew, a mammal species endemic to the United States
- Spizaetus nanus, the Wallace's hawk-eagle, a bird of prey species

== See also ==
- Nanus (disambiguation)
