= Tennessee pebblesnail =

Conservation status
- Critically endangered, possibly extinct (IUCN 3.1)

- Possibly Extinct (NatureServe)

Scientific classification
- Kingdom: Animalia
- Phylum: Mollusca
- Class: Gastropoda
- Subclass: Caenogastropoda
- Order: Littorinimorpha
- Family: Lithoglyphidae
- Genus: Somatogyrus
- Species: S. currierianus

Binomial name
- Somatogyrus currierianus (Lea, 1863)

Synonyms
- Amnicola currieriana Lea, 1863; Amnicola currierianus Lea, 1863

Species of gastropod

The Tennessee pebblesnail (Somatogyrus currierianus) is a species of very small freshwater snail with an operculum. It is an aquatic gastropod mollusc in the family Lithoglyphidae.

== Distribution ==
This species is endemic to the Tennessee River in Madison County, Alabama in the United States. It is a critically endangered species, and possibly extinct having not been reported since the river was impounded. Assessment of its conservation status is encumbered by the difficulty in differentiating the various species of Somatogyrus from one another. However no specimens of any Somatogyrus species have been reported in recent surveys.
