= Flint pebblesnail =

Conservation status
- Vulnerable (NatureServe)

Scientific classification
- Kingdom: Animalia
- Phylum: Mollusca
- Class: Gastropoda
- Subclass: Caenogastropoda
- Order: Littorinimorpha
- Family: Lithoglyphidae
- Subfamily: Lithoglyphinae
- Genus: Somatogyrus
- Species: S. rheophilas

Binomial name
- Somatogyrus rheophilas Thompson, 1984

Synonyms
- Somatogyrus rheophilus Thompson, 1984

Species of gastropod

The Flint pebblesnail (Somatogyrus rheophilas) is a species of very small freshwater snail with an operculum. It is an aquatic gastropod mollusc in the family Lithoglyphidae.

== Distribution ==
This species is endemic to the Flint River in Georgia in the United States.
