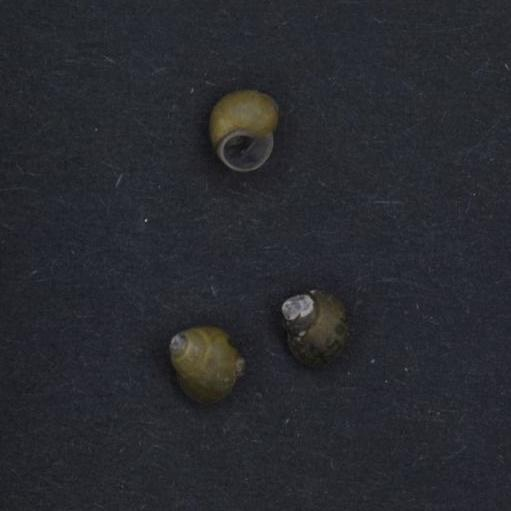
- Fluminicola nuttallianus shell

Conservation status
- Possibly Extinct (NatureServe)

Scientific classification
- Kingdom: Animalia
- Phylum: Mollusca
- Class: Gastropoda
- Subclass: Caenogastropoda
- Order: Littorinimorpha
- Family: Lithoglyphidae
- Genus: Fluminicola
- Species: F. nuttallianus

Binomial name
- Fluminicola nuttallianus (Lea, 1838)

Synonyms
- Anculotus nuttalii Reeve, 1861; Paludina nuttalliana Lea, 1838

= Fluminicola nuttallianus =

Species of gastropod

Fluminicola nuttallianus, common name dusky pebblesnail, is a possibly extinct species of freshwater snail with an operculum, an aquatic gastropod mollusk in the family Lithoglyphidae.

Fluminicola nuttallianus is the type species of the genus Fluminicola.

== Distribution ==
This species occurs, or occurred, in Oregon, USA.

== Description ==
Fluminicola nuttallianus has several rows of teeth on its radula - the exact number is unknown. Each row has 2-3 central basocones, 4-5 central ectocones, 7-8 lateral teeth, around 16 inner marginal teeth and 12-13 outer marginal teeth.
