= Panhandle pebblesnail =

Conservation status
- Least Concern (IUCN 3.1)

- Imperiled (NatureServe)

Scientific classification
- Kingdom: Animalia
- Phylum: Mollusca
- Class: Gastropoda
- Subclass: Caenogastropoda
- Order: Littorinimorpha
- Family: Lithoglyphidae
- Genus: Somatogyrus
- Species: S. virginicus

Binomial name
- Somatogyrus virginicus Walker, 1904

Species of gastropod

The Panhandle pebblesnail, scientific name Somatogyrus virginicus, is a species of very small or minute freshwater snail with an operculum, an aquatic gastropod mollusk in the family Hydrobiidae. This species is endemic to the United States. Its natural habitat is rivers, where it prefers areas with the fastest current.
