= Benedictia maxima =

Scientific classification
- Kingdom: Animalia
- Phylum: Mollusca
- Class: Gastropoda
- Subclass: Caenogastropoda
- Order: Littorinimorpha
- Family: Lithoglyphidae
- Genus: Benedictia
- Species: B. maxima

Binomial name
- Benedictia maxima Dybowski, 1875

Synonyms
- Hydrobia maxima W. Dybowski, 1875

Species of gastropod

Benedictia maxima is a species of freshwater snail with an operculum, an aquatic gastropod mollusc in the family Lithoglyphidae.

== Subspecies ==
- Benedictia maxima maxima (W. Dybowski, 1875)
- Benedictia maxima marisminus (Sitnikova, 1987)

== Distribution ==
Benedictia maxima maxima lives in the southern and central parts of Lake Baikal, Siberia, in depths from 40 to 260 m. The type locality for Benedictia maxima maxima is Kultuk, in southern Baikal.

Benedictia maxima marisminus lives in the northern part of Lake Baikal, in depths from 20 to 220 m. The type locality for Benedictia maxima marisminus is Maloe More, in northern Baikal.
