= S. aureus (disambiguation) =

Staphylococcus aureus (abbreviated S. aureus) is a facultatively anaerobic, Gram-positive coccus species and the most common cause of staph infections.

S. aureus may also refer to:

- Scleropages aureus, a proposed species of the Asian arowana, a fish species native to Southeast Asia
- Senecio aureus, the golden ragwort, a perennial flowering plant species native to eastern North America
- Sericulus aureus, the flame bowerbird, a bird species endemic to rainforests of New Guinea
- Somatogyrus aureus, the golden pebblesnail, a minute freshwater snail species endemic to the United States

== See also ==
- Aureus (disambiguation)
