= Lithoglyphus pyramidatus =

Lithoglyphus pyramidatus Temporal range: Early Pleistocene–Recent

Scientific classification
- Kingdom: Animalia
- Phylum: Mollusca
- Class: Gastropoda
- Subclass: Caenogastropoda
- Order: Littorinimorpha
- Family: Lithoglyphidae
- Genus: Lithoglyphus
- Species: L. pyramidatus

Binomial name
- Lithoglyphus pyramidatus Möllendorff, 1873

Synonyms
- Paludina fusca C. Pfeiffer, 1828

Species of gastropod

Lithoglyphus pyramidatus is a species of freshwater snail with an operculum, an aquatic gastropod mollusk in the family Lithoglyphidae.

== Distribution ==
The distribution of Lithoglyphus pyramidatus includes:

- Ukraine
- The northern Balkan Peninsula
- north-western Anatolia

The type locality for this species is Vrbas River near Banja Luka, Bosnia.

== Description ==
The shell has 4 whorls. The width of the shell is 7 mm. The height of the shell is 8.5 mm.

== Ecology ==
Lithoglyphus pyramidatus lives in rivers and in brooks.
