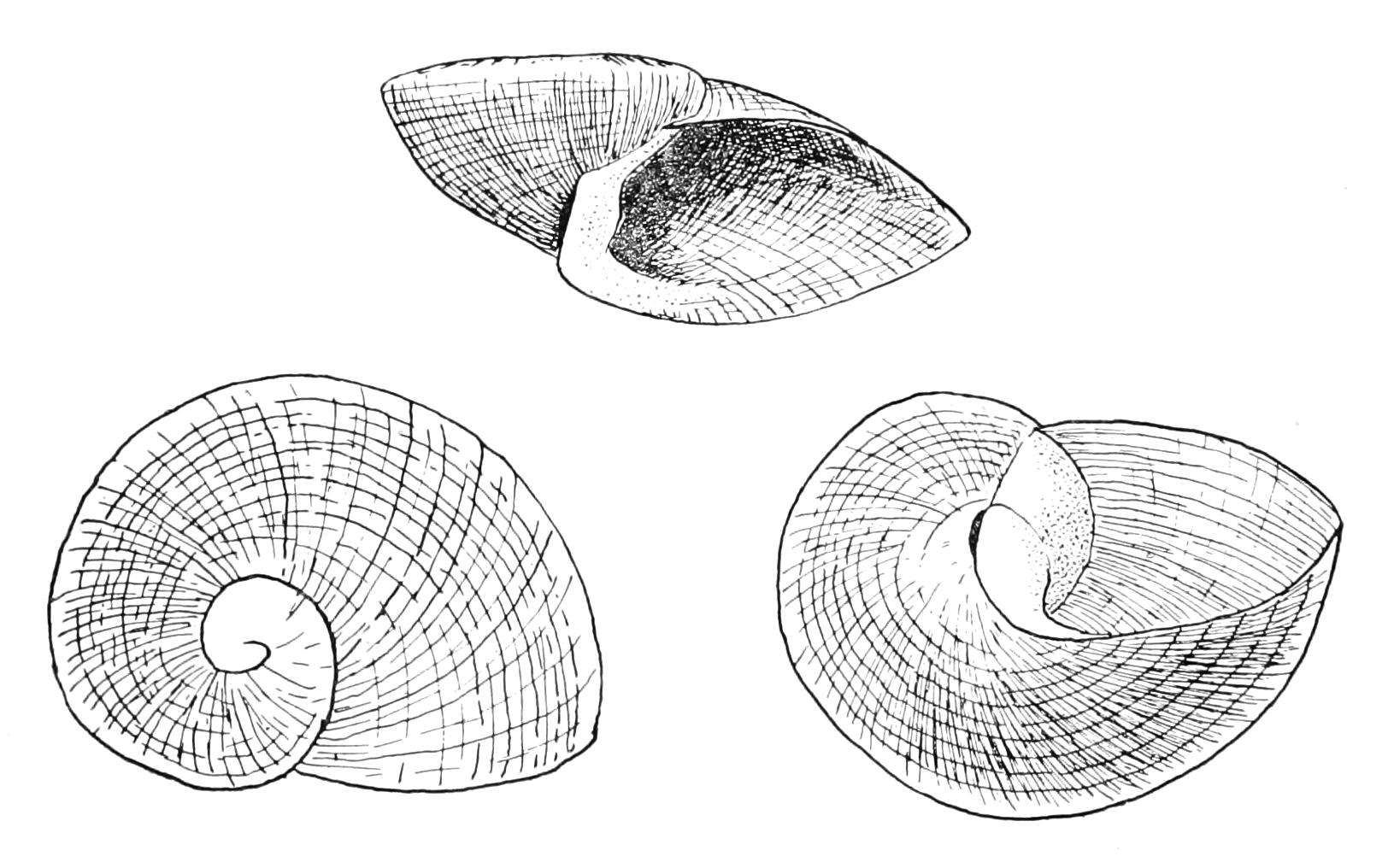
- Three views of a shell of Neoplanorbis tantillus oriented as if it were a dextral shell. (All planorbids are in fact sinistral.)

Scientific classification
- Kingdom: Animalia
- Phylum: Mollusca
- Class: Gastropoda
- Superorder: Hygrophila
- Family: Planorbidae
- Genus: †Neoplanorbis; Pilsbry, 1906

Type species
- Neoplanorbis tantillus Pilsbry, 1906

Species
- N. carinatus Walker, 1908; N. smithii Walker, 1908; N. tantillus Pilsbry, 1906; N. umbilicatus Walker, 1908

= Neoplanorbis =

Genus of gastropods

Neoplanorbis is a genus of small, freshwater, air-breathing snails. They are aquatic pulmonate gastropod mollusks in the family Planorbidae, the ram's horn snails.

Neoplanorbis is the type genus of the subfamily Neoplanorbinae.

The shells of species in this genus appear to be dextral in coiling, but as is the case in all planorbids, the shell is actually sinistral. The shell is carried upside down with the aperture on the right, and this makes it appear to be dextral.

== Species ==
The genus Neoplanorbis includes the following species:

- † Neoplanorbis carinatus Walker, 1908
- † Neoplanorbis smithii Walker, 1908
- † Neoplanorbis tantillus Pilsbry, 1906 the type species
- † Neoplanorbis umbilicatus Walker, 1908

== Original description ==
Genus Neoplanorbis was originally described by Henry Augustus Pilsbry in 1906.

Note that Pilsbry described the shell as if it were dextral, whereas planorbids are now known to be sinistral in shell coiling. In other words what Pilsbry describes as the "impressed and turned in" apex of the shell is actually the center of the umbilicus.

Pilsbry's original text (the original description) reads as follows:

Genus NEOPLANORBIS n. gen.

The shell is minute, subdiscoidal, nearly flat above, convex below, perforate, carinate at the periphery, composed of about two rapidly enlarging whorls, the apex impressed and turned in. The aperture is very oblique, wider than high, a little dilated at the base. Peristome thin, not continuous, the columellar margin straight and broadly dilated, somewhat thickened within.

The dentition and so far as known, the soft anatomy, is similar to Amphigyra.

Type N. tantillus.

The type of this group was at first taken for a Planorbis of the P. dilatatus group, (It was reported as Planorbis tantillus in Mr. Hinkley's list, Nautilus XVIII, p. 54.) but when the dentition was examined it became obvious at once that the snail could not belong to the Planorbinae. The radula is not materially unlike that of Amphigyra, but the conchological features of the two groups are quite diverse, Amphigyra being Crepiduloid with a distinct "deck" or columellar plate, while Neoplanorbis is Planorbis-shaped, perforate, with a carinate periphery and no "deck."
