= Compact pebblesnail =

Conservation status
- Unranked (NatureServe)

Scientific classification
- Kingdom: Animalia
- Phylum: Mollusca
- Class: Gastropoda
- Subclass: Caenogastropoda
- Order: Littorinimorpha
- Family: Lithoglyphidae
- Genus: Somatogyrus
- Species: S. pumilus

Binomial name
- Somatogyrus pumilus (Conrad, 1834)

Synonyms
- Amnicola pumilus Conrad, 1834; Anculotus pumilus Conrad, 1834

Species of gastropod

The compact pebblesnail (Somatogyrus pumilus) is a species of very small freshwater snail with an operculum. It is an aquatic gastropod mollusc in the family Lithoglyphidae.

== Distribution ==
This species is endemic to rivers in Alabama in the United States.
