= Dwarf pebblesnail =

Conservation status
- Critically endangered, possibly extinct (IUCN 3.1)

- Possibly Extinct (NatureServe)

Scientific classification
- Kingdom: Animalia
- Phylum: Mollusca
- Class: Gastropoda
- Subclass: Caenogastropoda
- Order: Littorinimorpha
- Family: Lithoglyphidae
- Genus: Somatogyrus
- Species: S. nanus

Binomial name
- Somatogyrus nanus Walker, 1904

Species of gastropod

The dwarf pebblesnail (Somatogyrus nanus) is a species of very small or minute freshwater snail with an operculum, an aquatic gastropod mollusc in the family Lithoglyphidae.

This species is endemic to Alabama in the United States. Its natural habitat is the Coosa River, but it has not been collected since the river was impounded.
