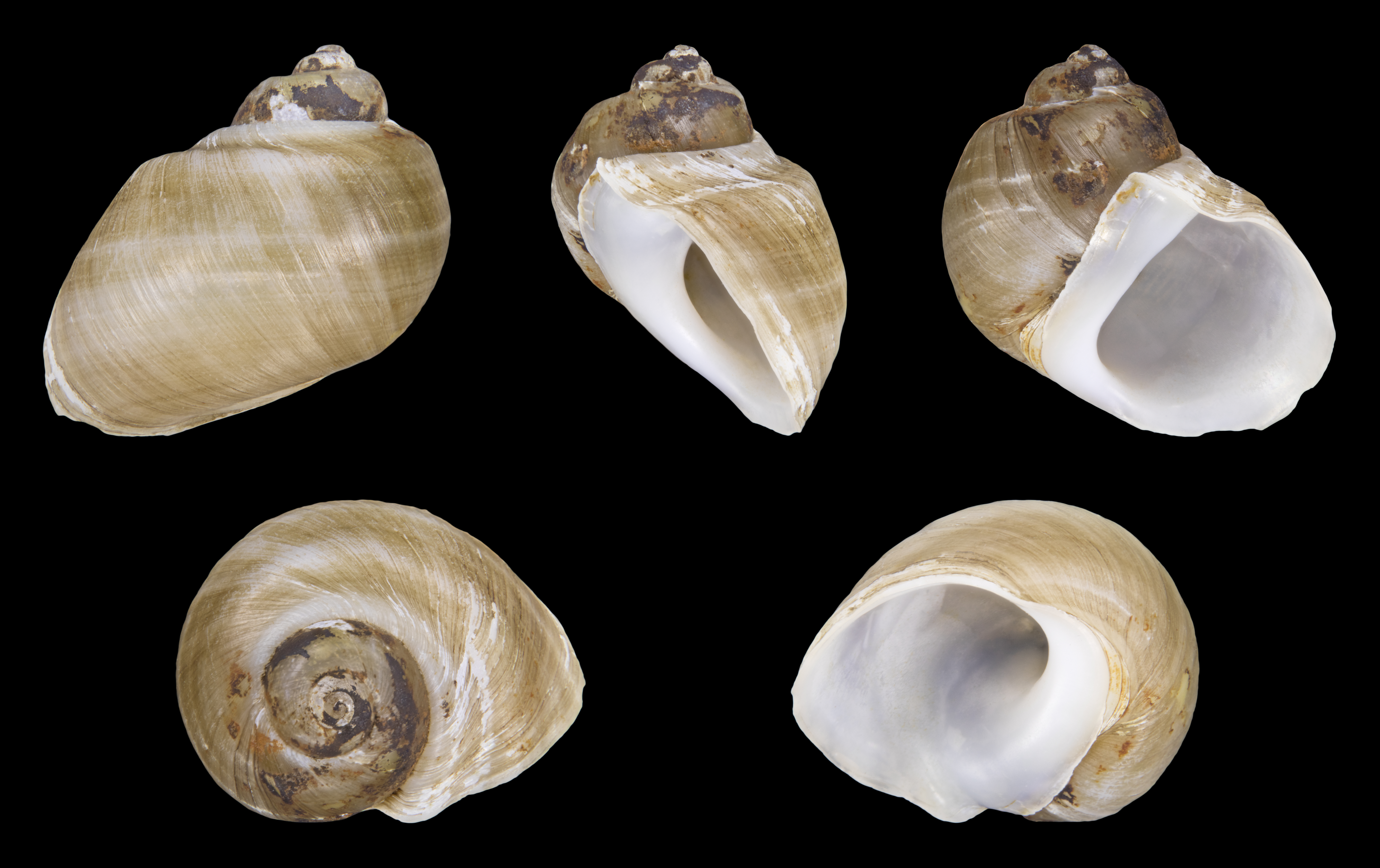
- A shell of Lithoglyphus apertus

Scientific classification
- Kingdom: Animalia
- Phylum: Mollusca
- Class: Gastropoda
- Subclass: Caenogastropoda
- Order: Littorinimorpha
- Family: Lithoglyphidae
- Genus: Lithoglyphus
- Species: L. apertus

Binomial name
- Lithoglyphus apertus (Küster, 1852)

Synonyms
- Paludina aperta Küster, 1852

= Lithoglyphus apertus =

Species of gastropod

Lithoglyphus apertus is a species of freshwater snail with an operculum, an aquatic gastropod mollusk in the family Lithoglyphidae.

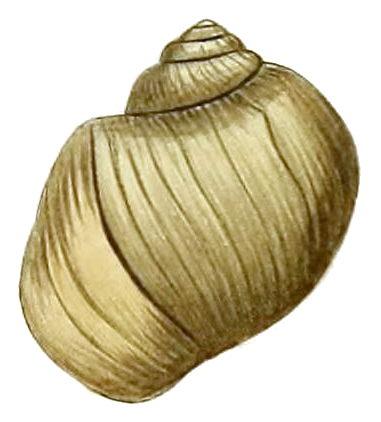
Drawing of abapertural view of the shell of Lithoglyphus apertus

== Distribution ==
The distribution of Lithoglyphus apertus includes rivers and sea-related areas near the northern Black Sea.

The type locality is "in der Save bei Agram in Croatien", which means in the Sava River near Zagreb, Croatia.
