= B. maxima =

B. maxima may refer to:

- Benedictia maxima, a freshwater snail
- Bombina maxima, an Asian toad
- Brefeldia maxima, a slime mold
- Briza maxima, a plant with edible seeds and leaves
