= Ohio pebblesnail =

Conservation status
- Imperiled (NatureServe)

Scientific classification
- Kingdom: Animalia
- Phylum: Mollusca
- Class: Gastropoda
- Subclass: Caenogastropoda
- Order: Littorinimorpha
- Family: Lithoglyphidae
- Genus: Somatogyrus
- Species: S. integra

Binomial name
- Somatogyrus integra (Say, 1829)

Synonyms
- Melania integra Say, 1829; Somatogyrus integer (Say, 1829)

Species of gastropod

The Ohio pebblesnail (Somatogyrus integra) is a species of very small freshwater snail with an operculum. It is an aquatic gastropod mollusc in the family Lithoglyphidae.

== Distribution ==
This species is endemic to the Ohio River and tributaries in Ohio, Illinois, Indiana, Kentucky and Pennsylvania in the United States.
