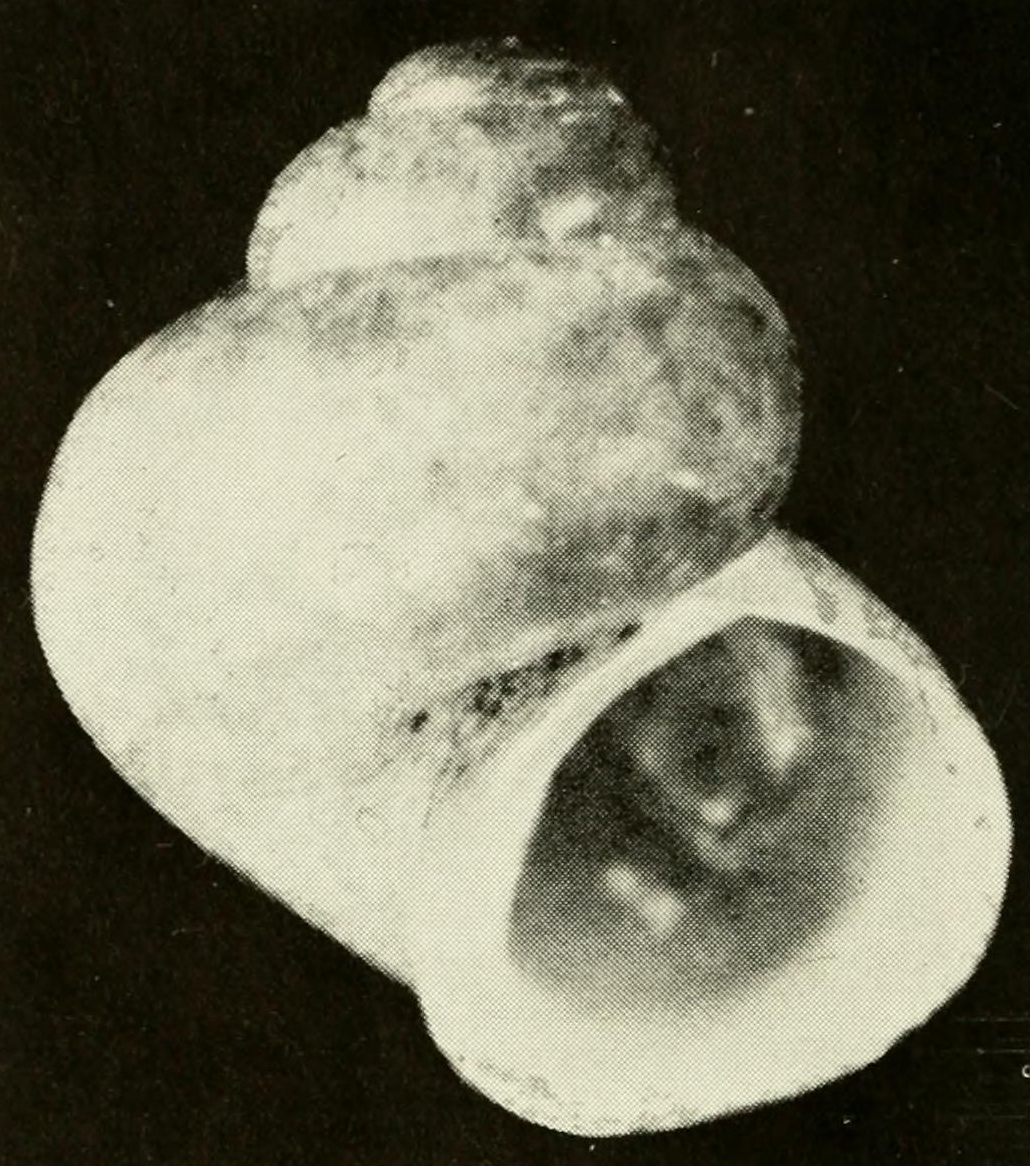
- Black and white photo of apertural view of the shell of Clappia cahabensis

Conservation status
- Extinct (IUCN 2.3)

- Critically Imperiled (NatureServe)

Scientific classification
- Kingdom: Animalia
- Phylum: Mollusca
- Class: Gastropoda
- Subclass: Caenogastropoda
- Order: Littorinimorpha
- Family: Lithoglyphidae
- Genus: Clappia
- Species: †C. cahabensis

Binomial name
- †Clappia cahabensis Clench, 1965

Synonyms
- Clappia cabahensis Clench, 1965

= Cahaba pebblesnail =

Species of gastropod

The Cahaba pebblesnail, scientific name Clappia cahabensis, is a species of very small freshwater snail, aquatic gastropod mollusks in the family Lithoglyphidae.

This species is named after the Cahaba River. This species is endemic to the United States.

This species was listed as extinct in the 2006 and 2010 IUCN Red List. It was thought to be extinct because of water pollution coming from modern surface mining of coal in the USA.

Until recently the Cahaba pebblesnail was believed to be extinct, one of 34 snail species fallen victim to dams built along the Coosa River between 1917 and 1967. In 2004 however, biologists discovered the snail living less than fifty miles to the west, in Alabama's Cahaba River, which parallels the Coosa.

Bibb County, Alabama (marked red) where the species is found in the Cahaba River.

== Description ==
Clappia cahabensis has been described by American malacologist William J. Clench in 1965. Clench's type description reads as follows:

Clappia cahabensis, new species. Fig. 2.

Shell small, reaching 3 mm. in length, umbilicate, and smooth. Color a yellowish brown, whorls 3.5, strongly convex. Suture indented. Spire extended. Aperture subcircular, slightly flaring, holostomatous and attached to the body whorl only at its upper part. Umbilicus narrow and deep. No sculpture. Periostracum thin. Operculum paucispiral with the nucleus nearly centered. Animal white.

length width

3.5 mm. 2.7 mm. Holotype

3 2.4 Paratype

Types. Holotype, Museum of Comparative Zoology no. 251167, from the Cahaba River, 1 mile north of Centreville, Bibb Co., Alabama, Leslie Hubricht collector, Nov. 18, 1964.

Remarks. This is the second known species in the genus Clappia. The type species, C. clappi Walker is known from the Coosa River at Duncan's Ripple, The Bar, and Higgin's Ferry, all in Chilton County; and Butting Ram Shoals in Coosa County, Alabama. The Cahaba River at Centreville is 160 river miles from the southmost Coosa locality.

This species differs from C. clappi by being proportionately more attenuate, having a smaller umbilicus and a less flaring margin of the aperture. Walker stated that the animal was black in C. clappi (Nautilus 22: 90).

The soft anatomy of C. cahabensis is white.

== Ecology ==
Its natural habitat is rivers. Clappia cahabensis requires rapid flowing sections of river shoals.
