= Reverse pebblesnail =

Conservation status
- Extinct (outdated) (IUCN 3.1)

- Critically Imperiled (NatureServe)

Scientific classification
- Kingdom: Animalia
- Phylum: Mollusca
- Class: Gastropoda
- Subclass: Caenogastropoda
- Order: Littorinimorpha
- Family: Lithoglyphidae
- Genus: Somatogyrus
- Species: †S. alcoviensis

Binomial name
- †Somatogyrus alcoviensis Krieger, 1972

Species of gastropod

The reverse pebblesnail, scientific name Somatogyrus alcoviensis, is a species of small freshwater snail with a gill and an operculum, an aquatic gastropod mollusc in the family Hydrobiidae.

This species is endemic to Newton County, Georgia in the United States, where it occurs in the Alcovy and Yellow Rivers. It was believed extinct until it was rediscovered in a 2000 survey.
