= Mimic cavesnail =

Conservation status
- Vulnerable (IUCN 2.3)

- Critically Imperiled (NatureServe)

Scientific classification
- Kingdom: Animalia
- Phylum: Mollusca
- Class: Gastropoda
- Subclass: Caenogastropoda
- Order: Littorinimorpha
- Family: Lithoglyphidae
- Genus: Phreatodrobia
- Species: P. imitata

Binomial name
- Phreatodrobia imitata Hershler & Longley, 1986

Species of gastropod

The mimic cavesnail, scientific name Phreatodrobia imitata, is a species of very small or minute freshwater snail with a gill and an operculum, an aquatic gastropod mollusk in the family Hydrobiidae.

== Distribution ==
This species is endemic to Texas in the United States, where it is known from three wells that penetrate the Edwards Aquifer. The type locality is Verstraeten Well, Bexar County, Texas.

== Description ==
The shell has 3.3 to 3.5 whorls. The average height of the shell is 1.01 to 1.03 mm. The operculum is thin and the radula is trapezoidal.

== Conservation ==
The mimic cavesnail was denied federal listing as an endangered species in 2023. Threats to the snail include physical expulsion via wells, loss of aquifer water due to imbalances between recharge and extraction and groundwater contamination. The U.S. Fish and Wildlife Service stated that although climate change is likely to reduce aquifer recharge, human extraction will be reduced concomitantly due to existing regulations protecting the aquifer. The Fish and Wildlife Service was unable to conclude whether groundwater contamination will cause significant impacts, due to the snail's benthic habitat within the large volume of the aquifer and the uncertain magnitude of impact of urbanization around the city of San Antonio. Finally, as of 2023, two of the three wells that ejected snails were no longer functioning, and no new wells have been drilled since 1995 in the area of analysis (Bexar County, Texas).
