= Pahranagat pebblesnail =

Conservation status
- Data Deficient (IUCN 2.3)

Scientific classification
- Kingdom: Animalia
- Phylum: Mollusca
- Class: Gastropoda
- Subclass: Caenogastropoda
- Order: Littorinimorpha
- Family: Lithoglyphidae
- Genus: Fluminicola
- Species: F. merriami

Binomial name
- Fluminicola merriami (Pilsbry & Beecher, 1892)

Species of gastropod

The Pahranagat pebblesnail also known as the Pahranagat Valley turban snail, scientific name Fluminicola merriami, is a species of very small or minute freshwater snail with an operculum, an aquatic gastropod mollusk in the family Lithoglyphidae. This species is endemic to the United States.
