= Mud pebblesnail =

Conservation status
- Data Deficient (IUCN 2.3)

- Possibly Extinct (NatureServe)

Scientific classification
- Kingdom: Animalia
- Phylum: Mollusca
- Class: Gastropoda
- Subclass: Caenogastropoda
- Order: Littorinimorpha
- Family: Lithoglyphidae
- Genus: Somatogyrus
- Species: S. sargenti

Binomial name
- Somatogyrus sargenti Pilsbry, 1895

Species of gastropod

The mud pebblesnail, scientific name Somatogyrus sargenti, is a species of small freshwater snails with a gill and an operculum, aquatic gastropod mollusks in the family Hydrobiidae. This species is endemic to the United States.
