= Sandbar pebblesnail =

Conservation status
- Imperiled (NatureServe)

Scientific classification
- Kingdom: Animalia
- Phylum: Mollusca
- Class: Gastropoda
- Subclass: Caenogastropoda
- Order: Littorinimorpha
- Family: Lithoglyphidae
- Genus: Somatogyrus
- Species: S. depressus

Binomial name
- Somatogyrus depressus (Tryon, 1862)

Synonyms
- Amnicola depressa Tryon, 1862

Species of gastropod

The Sandbar pebblesnail (Somatogyrus depressus) is a species of very small freshwater snail with an operculum. It is an aquatic gastropod mollusc in the family Lithoglyphidae.

== Distribution ==
This species is endemic to the Mississippi River, Missouri River and their relative watersheds in Wisconsin, Iowa, Illinois and Missouri in the United States. Assessment of its conservation status is encumbered by the difficulty in differentiating the various species of Somatogyrus from one another.
