= Columbia pebblesnail =

Conservation status
- Data Deficient (IUCN 2.3)

Scientific classification
- Kingdom: Animalia
- Phylum: Mollusca
- Class: Gastropoda
- Subclass: Caenogastropoda
- Order: Littorinimorpha
- Family: Lithoglyphidae
- Genus: Fluminicola
- Species: F. columbiana

Binomial name
- Fluminicola columbiana Hemphill in Pilsbry, 1899

Species of gastropod

The Columbia pebblesnail, scientific name Fluminicola columbiana, is a species of very small freshwater snail that have an operculum, aquatic gastropod mollusk in the family Lithoglyphidae. This species is endemic to the United States.
