= Little Wills =

Little Wills may refer to:

- Little Wills Creek, a creek in Pennsylvania
- Little Wills Valley, a valley in Alabama
