= Antrorbis =

Scientific classification
- Kingdom: Animalia
- Phylum: Mollusca
- Class: Gastropoda
- Subclass: Caenogastropoda
- Order: Littorinimorpha
- Superfamily: Truncatelloidea
- Family: Lithoglyphidae
- Genus: Antrorbis; Hershler & Thompson, 1990

Type species
- Antrorbis breweri Hershler & F. G. Thompson, 1990

Genus of gastropods

Antrorbis is a genus of minute freshwater snails with gills and opercula, aquatic gastropod molluscs in the family Lithoglyphidae.

The generic name is derived from Classical Greek language word "antrum", that means a cave and from Greek language word "orbis", that means circle.

== Species ==
- Antrorbis breweri Hershler & F. G. Thompson, 1990
- Antrorbis tennesseensis Perez, Shoobs, Gladstone, & Niemiller, 2019
