= Nicolla skrjabini =

Scientific classification
- Kingdom: Animalia
- Phylum: Platyhelminthes
- Class: Trematoda
- Order: Plagiorchiida
- Family: Opecoelidae
- Genus: Nicolla
- Species: N. skrjabini

Binomial name
- Nicolla skrjabini (Iwanitzki, 1928)

Species of fluke

Nicolla skrjabini is a species of trematode in the family Opecoelidae.

== Distribution ==
The distribution of Nicolla skrjabini includes rivers of the Azov-Black Sea and rivers of the Baltic Sea. Expansion of its host species Lithoglyphus naticoides to the Volga River has allowed Nicolla skrjabini to expand its range.

== Hosts ==
Hosts of Nicolla skrjabini include:

- Snail Lithoglyphus naticoides serves as the first intermediate host
- Gammarus balcanicus is the experimental second intermediate host
- Definitive host can be 27 species of fish.
