= Golden pebblesnail =

Conservation status
- Data Deficient (IUCN 3.1)

- Critically Imperiled (NatureServe)

Scientific classification
- Kingdom: Animalia
- Phylum: Mollusca
- Class: Gastropoda
- Subclass: Caenogastropoda
- Order: Littorinimorpha
- Family: Lithoglyphidae
- Genus: Somatogyrus
- Species: S. aureus

Binomial name
- Somatogyrus aureus Tryon, 1865

Species of gastropod

The golden pebblesnail, scientific name Somatogyrus aureus, is a species of small freshwater snails with an operculum, aquatic gastropod molluscs or micromolluscs in the family Lithoglyphidae. This species is endemic to Alabama and Tennessee in the United States. Its natural habitat is the Tennessee River system, with the type locality being given as the Holston River.

The taxonomic status of S. aureus is unclear, as it is morphologically similar to other species. However, if it is a valid species, it would be assessed as Critically Endangered (possibly extinct). Although the IUCN officially categorises the species as Data Deficient, it also considers it as Possibly extinct, as it has not been definitively recorded alive since the river was impounded in 1936. A purported finding from Marion County, Tennessee in 1997 has yet to be confirmed.
