= Neoplanorbis carinatus =

Conservation status
- Extinct (IUCN 2.3)

- Presumed Extinct (NatureServe)

Scientific classification
- Kingdom: Animalia
- Phylum: Mollusca
- Class: Gastropoda
- Superorder: Hygrophila
- Family: Planorbidae
- Genus: †Neoplanorbis
- Species: †N. carinatus

Binomial name
- †Neoplanorbis carinatus Walker, 1908

Extinct species of freshwater snail

Neoplanorbis carinatus, commonly known as the carinate flat-top snail, was a species of air-breathing freshwater snail, an aquatic pulmonate gastropod mollusk in the family Planorbidae. First described in 1908, this species was endemic to the Coosa River in Alabama but is now considered likely to be extinct following the damming of its habitat.

== Taxonomy and history ==
Neoplanorbis carinatus was described in 1908 by Bryant Walker based on type material collected from Duncan's Riffle, a stretch of the Coosa River located in Coosa County, Alabama. This description, alongside the descriptions of Neoplanorbis smithii and N. umbilicatus, were published in volume 21 of the journal The Nautilus. Walker reported that these three Neoplanorbis species were first discovered in the wild by Herbert H. Smith in 1907 and that they were plentiful in suitable areas of the Coosa River at this time, though highly localized, writing that they "may be abundant on one shoal and not found at all on another. And on the same shoal, it is frequently restricted to one side of the river or the other".

Following extensive damming of the Coosa River, a survey conducted in June of 1959 by Paul F. Basch and John B. Burch failed to locate any Neoplanorbis snails in the Coosa. In 2000 N. carinatus was assessed for the International Union for the Conservation of Nature Red List as extinct, with NatureServe and the American Fisheries Society assessing the species as extinct in 2004 and 2013 respectively.

== Distribution and habitat ==
Neoplanorbis carinatus was endemic to the Coosa River in Alabama, where it was restricted to shoal habitats. It lived under rocks in fast-flowing waters.
