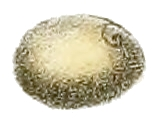
- An 1870 drawing of the shell of Lepyrium showalteri

Conservation status
- Vulnerable (IUCN 2.3)

- Critically Imperiled (NatureServe)

Scientific classification
- Kingdom: Animalia
- Phylum: Mollusca
- Class: Gastropoda
- Subclass: Caenogastropoda
- Order: Littorinimorpha
- Family: Lithoglyphidae
- Subfamily: Lithoglyphinae
- Genus: Lepyrium; Dall, 1896
- Species: L. showalteri

Binomial name
- Lepyrium showalteri (Lea, 1861)

Synonyms
- Lepyrium showalteri cahawbensis Pilsbry, 1906; Neritina showalterii Lea, 1861

= Flat pebblesnail =

Species of gastropod

The flat pebblesnail (Lepyrium showalteri) is a species of freshwater snail, an aquatic gastropod mollusk in the family Lithoglyphidae.

This species is endemic to the United States. This snail has been listed as endangered on the United States Fish and Wildlife Service list of endangered species since October 28, 1998.

Lepyrium showalteri is the only species in the genus Lepyrium. Lepyrium showalteri is the type species of the genus Lepyrium. Lepyriidae is a synonym of Lithoglyphinae.

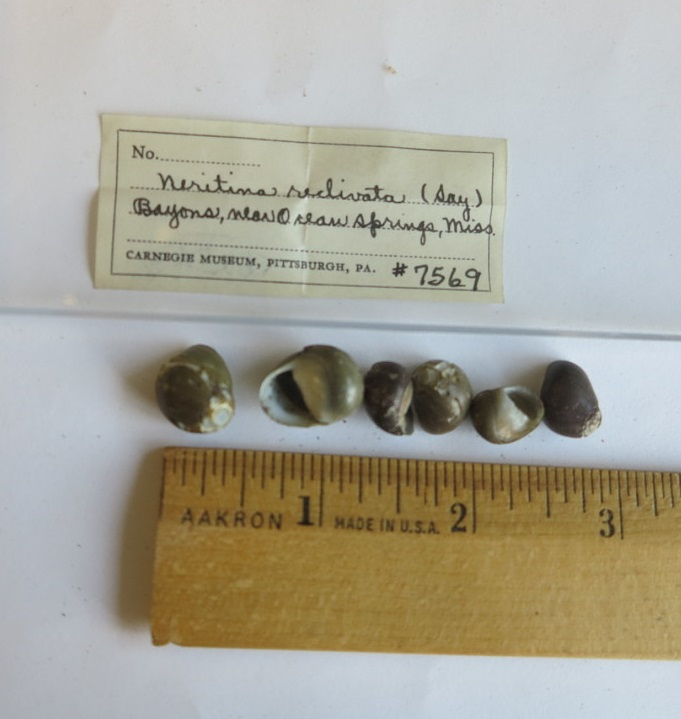
Flat pebblesnail (Lepyrium showalteri) shells from the Cahaba River

== Description ==
The flat pebblesnail is a small snail in the family Lithoglyphidae; however, the species has a large and distinctive-looking shell. This snail's shell is also distinguished by its depressed spire and expanded, flattened body whorl. The shells are ovate in outline, flattened, and grow to 3.5 to 4.4 mm (0.14 to 0.17 in) high and 4 to 5 mm (0.20 in) wide. The umbilical area is imperforate (no opening), and there are 2 to 3 whorls which rapidly expand.

The anatomy of this species was described in detail by Thompson in 1984.

== Original description ==
Species Lepyrium showalteri was originally described as Neritina showalteri by Isaac Lea in 1861.

Lea's original text (the type description) reads as follows:

Neritina Showalterii. Testâ, laevi, rotundatâ, diaphanâ, luteo-corneâ; spirâ valdè depressâ; suturis leviter impressis; anfractibus trinis, inflatis; aperturâ semirotundâ; labio dilatato, albo, incrassato, edentulo et incurvato; labro dilatato, tenui, margine acuto.

Operculum.

Hab. Coosa River, ten miles above Fort William, Shelby Co., Alabama. E. R. Showalter, M. D.

Remarks. The discovery of this shell by Dr. Showalter marks the first notice of the genus Neritina being observed in our fresh waters. His very close observation and active investigation of the waters of central and northern Alabama, have enabled him to lay the naturalists of this country under many obligations by new discoveries, and this is certainly one of much importance. We now see for the first time that this genus, which is common in Europe, Africa, Asia, South America and the West Indies, also inhabits our southern fresh waters. I have great pleasure in naming the species after the discoverer.

This species is not closely allied to any which has come under my notice. It is more rotund than usual, has a clear horn-colored epidermis, smooth and shining; the substance of the shell so thin as to permit the column to be visible through it.

It is to be regretted that among the four specimens sent to me by Dr. Showalter, neither had an operculum. The soft parts of the animal have not yet been observed.

== Distribution ==
This species is endemic to Alabama in the United States. It was historically known from:

- the mainstem Coosa River in Shelby County and Talladega County, Alabama;
- the Cahaba River in Bibb and Dallas County, Alabama;
- and the Little Cahaba River in Bibb County, Alabama.

The flat pebblesnail has not been found in the Coosa River portion of its range since the construction of the Lay Dam and Logan Martin Dam, and recent survey efforts have failed to locate any surviving populations outside of the Cahaba River drainage.

The flat pebblesnail is currently known from one site on the Little Cahaba River, Bibb County, and from a single shoal series on the Cahaba River above the Fall Line, Shelby County, Alabama.

Bibb County, Alabama (marked red) where the species is found in the Little Cahaba River.

Shelby County, Alabama (marked red) where the species is known from the Cahaba River.

== Ecology ==
Little is known of the natural history of this species. The flat pebblesnail is found attached to clean, smooth stones in rapid currents of river shoals. The eggs are laid in capsules on hard surfaces. The life span appears to be 1 year.
