= Phreatodrobia =

Scientific classification
- Kingdom: Animalia
- Phylum: Mollusca
- Class: Gastropoda
- Subclass: Caenogastropoda
- Order: Littorinimorpha
- Family: Lithoglyphidae
- Genus: Phreatodrobia; Hershler & Longley, 1986

Diversity
- 8 species

Genus of gastropods

Phreatodrobia is a genus of very small or minute freshwater snails with a gill and an operculum, aquatic gastropod mollusks in the family Lithoglyphidae.

The generic name Phreatodrobia is derived from the Greek word "phreatos" which means ground water, as in phreatic, and from the suffix -drobia based on family name Hydrobiidae (where it was originally classified), which means "living in water".

== Species ==
Species within the genus Phreatodrobia include:

- Phreatodrobia conica Hershler & Longley, 1986
- Phreatodrobia coronae Hershler, 1987
- Phreatodrobia imitata Hershler & Longley, 1986 - mimic cavesnail
- Phreatodrobia micra (Pilsbry & Ferriss, 1906) - type species
- Phreatodrobia nugax (Pilsbry & Ferriss, 1906)
  - Phreatodrobia nugax inclinata Hershler & Longley, 1986
- Phreatodrobia plana Hershler & Longley, 1986
- Phreatodrobia punctata Hershler & Longley, 1986
- Phreatodrobia rotunda Hershler & Longley, 1986
