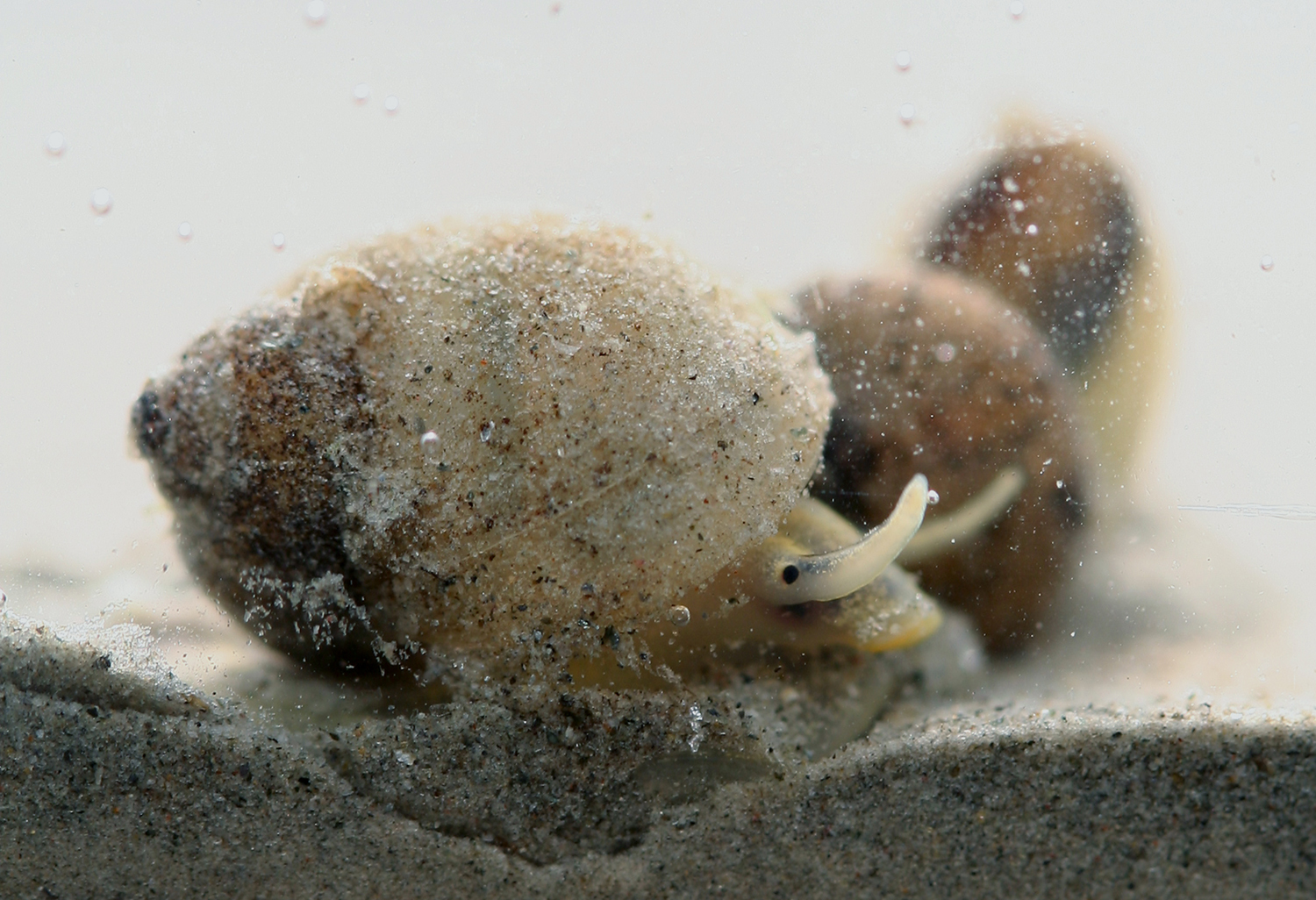
- live Lithoglyphus naticoides

Scientific classification
- Kingdom: Animalia
- Phylum: Mollusca
- Class: Gastropoda
- Subclass: Caenogastropoda
- Order: Littorinimorpha
- Family: Lithoglyphidae
- Subfamily: Lithoglyphinae
- Genus: Lithoglyphus; Menke, 1830

= Lithoglyphus =

Genus of gastropods

Lithoglyphus is a genus of freshwater snails with gills and an operculum, a gastropod mollusk in the family Lithoglyphidae.

== Taxonomy ==
Lithoglyphus is the type genus of the family Lithoglyphidae.

This taxon has been established by Karl Theodor Menke in 1830 as subgenus Lithoglyphus "Zgl." (Ziegler) (of Paludina, the only name given to section D) without bibliographical reference, with a short description ([Paludina] ovatae, spira brevi) and with 2 species included Paludina fusca Pfeiffer, 1828 and Paludina naticoides Pfeiffer, 1828. The type species Paludina naticoides was designated by August Nicolaus Herrmannsen in 1846.

Various authors mentioned this taxon in a different way: It has been mentioned without description or indication as Lithoglyp. eburneus "Megerle ab Mühlfeld" by Hartmann in 1821 (it is unavailable because the abbreviation was not unambiguous and because the species was a nomen nudum, genus had no description). Mentioned by Pfeiffer in 1828 as a synonym of Paludina in the combination "Lithoglyphus fuscus, Ziegler" (for Paludina fusca Pfeiffer, 1828 from Slovenia). Fitzinger in 1833 spelled as Lithoglypter naticoides and mentioned Lithoglypus eburneus "Mühlfeld" as a synonym.

Krynicki in 1837 spelled Lithoclypus naticoides "Meg." without bibliographic reference. Westerlund in 1885 gave author Mühlenfeldt in Sturm's Fauna 1821, and listed as synonyms Lithoglypter Fitzinger, 1833, Lithoclypus Villa 1844 and Lithoclyptus Schmidt (Sherborn 1922 has "Syst. Verz. Krain. Conch. 1847, 24"). Sherborn in 1922 attributed this name to "Megerle in Hartmann in Sturm, Deutsch. Fauna (VI. Würm.) (5) 1821, 57" and to "Ziegler in Pfeiffer, Naturg. deutsch. land-Moll. (3) 1828, 47". Wenz (1938: p. 577) and Kabat & Hershler (1993: 33) gave as author Hartmann, 1821 (p. 57, "Originally spelled as "Lithoglyp."; emended to Lithoglyphus by Pfeiffer (1828: 47)"). Falkner et al. in 2001 gave Pfeiffer, 1828 as author (without any comment in an uncommented checklist).

Pfeiffer's 1828 name is not available, it would need a publication from before 1960 (and from before Menke 1830) to have used the name for a genus or subgenus, with a bibliographical reference to Pfeiffer 1828. This is unlikely.

It is convenient to use the name as established by Menke 1830. If Menke's 1830 name is regarded as not having been used as a name in Menke's classification, the next available generic name for Paludina naticoides is Lithoglypter Fitzinger, 1833.

== Species ==
Species within the genus Lithoglyphus include:

- † Lithoglyphus acutus Cobălcescu, 1883
- † Lithoglyphus amplus Brusina, 1878
- Lithoglyphus apertus (Küster, 1852)
- † Lithoglyphus bellus Papaianopol, 2006
- † Lithoglyphus callosus Brusina, 1897
- † Lithoglyphus cingulatus Cobălcescu, 1883
- † Lithoglyphus euchilus Brusina, 1902
- † Lithoglyphus fuchsi Brusina, 1897
- Lithoglyphus fuscus (C. Pfeiffer, 1828)
- † Lithoglyphus gozhiki Neubauer, Harzhauser, Kroh, Georgopoulou & Mandic, 2014
- † Lithoglyphus histrio Neumayr in Neumayr & Paul, 1875
- † Lithoglyphus indifferens Brusina, 1902
- † Lithoglyphus jahni Urbański, 1975
- † Lithoglyphus maeoticus Papaianopol, 2006
- † Lithoglyphus nanus Roshka, 1973
- Lithoglyphus naticoides (C. Pfeiffer, 1828) - type species
- † Lithoglyphus neumayri Sinzov, 1876
- † Lithoglyphus novaki Brusina, 1897
- † Lithoglyphus obliquus Cobălcescu, 1883
- † Lithoglyphus ornatus Papaianopol, 2006
- † Lithoglyphus phrygicus Oppenheim, 1919
- Lithoglyphus prasinus (Kuster, 1852)
- Lithoglyphus pygmaeus Frauenfeld, 1863
- Lithoglyphus pyramidatus von Möllendorf, 1873
- † Lithoglyphus rarus Papaianopol, 2006
- † Lithoglyphus rumanus Stefanescu, 1896
- † Lithoglyphus sphaeridius Anistratenko & Gozhik, 1995
- † Lithoglyphus stricklandianus (Forbes, 1845)
- † Lithoglyphus subsphaeridius Anistratenko & Gozhik, 1995

Species brought into synonymy

- †Lithoglyphus decipiens Brusina, 1885 : synonym of † Lithoglyphus acutus decipiens Brusina, 1885
- † Lithoglyphus harpaeformis Cobălcescu, 1883 : synonym of † Lithoglyphus amplus Brusina, 1878
- † Lithoglyphus kinkelini Brusina, 1902 : synonym of † Lithoglyphus acutus decipiens Brusina, 1885
- † Lithoglyphus michaeli Cobălcescu, 1883 : synonym of † Lithoglyphus acutus michaeli Cobălcescu, 1883
- Lithoglyphus modestus Gredler, 1887 : synonym of Lithoglyphopsis modesta (Gredler, 1887)
- Lithoglyphus multicarinatus Miller, 1878 : synonym of Lithococcus multicarinatus (Miller, 1878)
- † Lithoglyphus panicum Neumayr, 1869 : synonym of † Bania panicum (Neumayr, 1869)
- † Lithoglyphus tripaloi Brusina, 1884 : synonym of † Bania tripaloi (Brusina, 1884)
