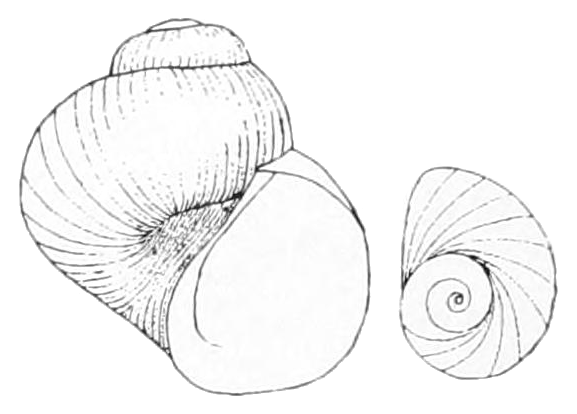
- Drawing of apertural view of the shell and its operculum of Clappia umbilicata

Scientific classification
- Kingdom: Animalia
- Phylum: Mollusca
- Class: Gastropoda
- Subclass: Caenogastropoda
- Order: Littorinimorpha
- Superfamily: Truncatelloidea
- Family: Lithoglyphidae
- Genus: Clappia; Walker, 1909

= Clappia (gastropod) =

Genus of molluscs

Clappia was a genus of small freshwater snails that have an operculum, aquatic gastropod mollusks in the family Lithoglyphidae.

Generic name Clappia is in honor of malacologist George Hubbard Clapp.

== Species ==
There are two species within the genus Clappia:

- †Clappia cahabensis Clench, 1965 - Cahaba pebblesnail
- †Clappia umbilicata (Walker, 1904) - Umbilicate pebblesnail, type species as †Clappia clappi

Synonyms

- Clappia cabahensis Clench, 1965: synonym of Clappia cahabensis Clench, 1965
- †Clappia clappi B. Walker, 1909: synonym of †Clappia umbilicata (B. Walker, 1904) (a junior synonym)

Comparison of apertural views of both species:

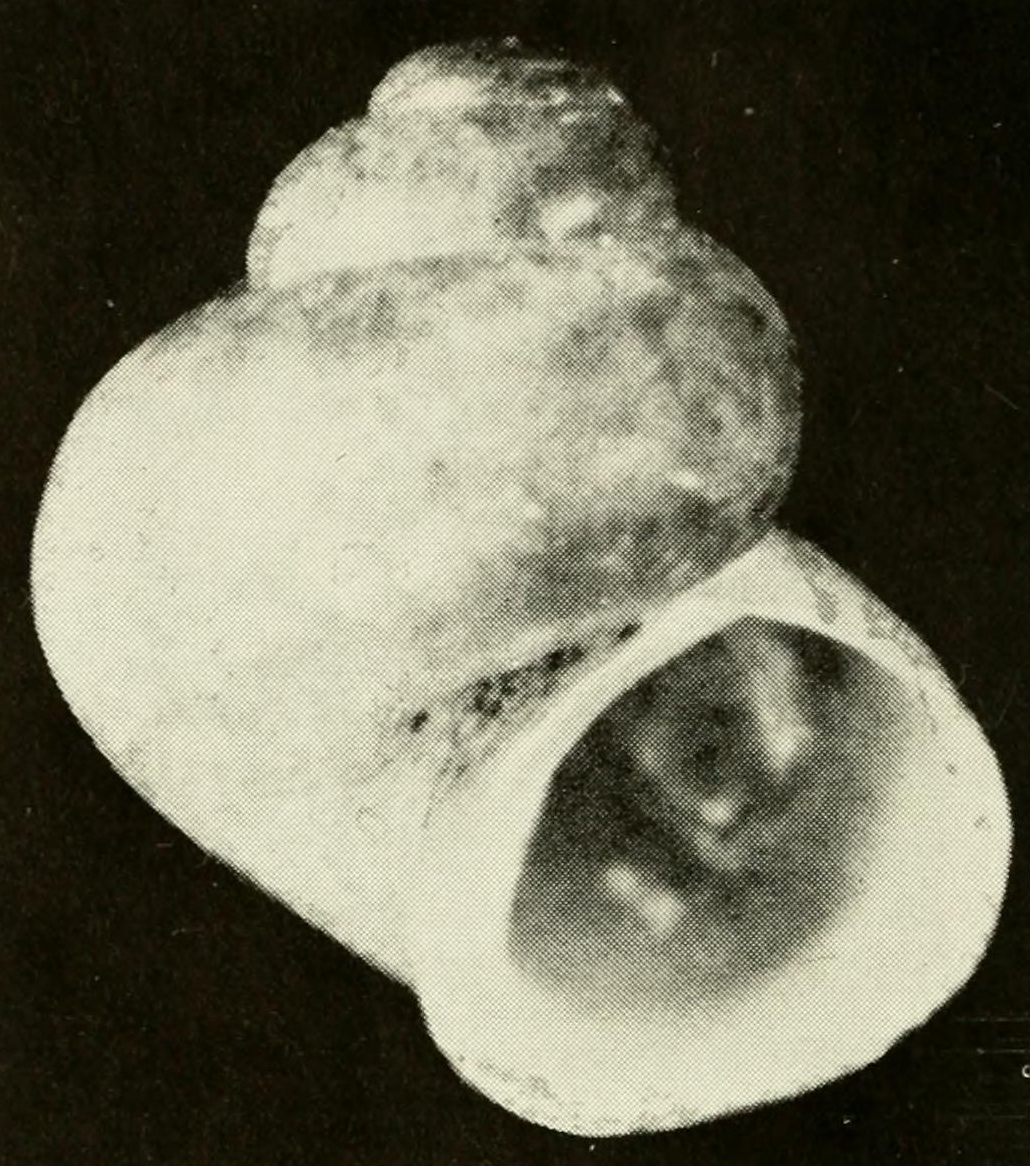
Clappia cahabensis

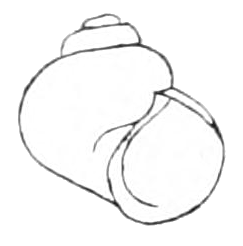
Clappia umbilicata
