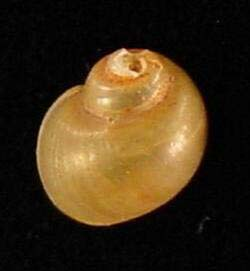
- Shell of Gillia altilis

Conservation status
- Least Concern (IUCN 3.1)

- Secure (NatureServe)

Scientific classification
- Kingdom: Animalia
- Phylum: Mollusca
- Class: Gastropoda
- Subclass: Caenogastropoda
- Order: Littorinimorpha
- Family: Lithoglyphidae
- Subfamily: Lithoglyphinae
- Genus: Gillia; Stimpson, 1865
- Species: G. altilis

Binomial name
- Gillia altilis (Lea, 1841)

Synonyms
- Genus synonymy: Fluminicola (Gillia) Stimpson, 1865; Melatoma Gray, 1847; Species synonymy: Leptoxis crenata Haldeman, 1847; Melania altilis Lea, 1841

= Gillia altilis =

Species of gastropod

Gillia altilis, common name the Buffalo pebblesnail, is a species of freshwater snail, an aquatic gastropod mollusk with an operculum in the family Lithoglyphidae.

Gillia altilis is the only species in the genus Gillia.

== Shell description ==
The shell of this species is inflated but still conical. The shell color is usually yellow to green. The shell has 2–4 whorls when eroded, and ~4.5 when intact. Each whorl is distinctly shouldered. The umbilicus is either not apparent, or very small. The columella is not thickened, and the shell itself can be thin or thick. The shell aperture is oval to ear-shaped. When viewed laterally, the outer lip of the shell bends forward.

The height of the shell is 6–8 mm (1/4–5/16 in).

The operculum is chitinous, oval, yellow to green in color and shows paucispiral markings, with a subcentral nucleus.

== Anatomy ==
The mantle is black, or shows dark pigmentation. This pigmentation is also seen in the nape, the anterior part of the snout, the top of the tentacles, and along the edge of the peristome (the margin of the gastropod shell).

The radula of Gillia altilis looks like a single serrated blade, with 51-55 rows of teeth. Each row has 2 central basocones, 3-4 central octocones, 8-9 lateral teeth, ca. 30 inner marginal teeth and 6-9 outer marginal teeth.

== Distribution ==
=== Indigenous distribution ===
Gillia altilis is native to the Atlantic coastal drainage of North America. It occurs from New York State and Vermont south to South Carolina.

In some regions where Gillia altilis is native, populations are declining or not very abundant: for example, in Vermont, this species is considered to be an invertebrate species in "greatest conservation need".

This snail is listed as a species of special concern in its native range in New York State, where the species is ranked as S1 (very vulnerable due to low abundance of species and/or required habitat), protected U SC (unprotected at present but of special concern due to increasing evidence of vulnerability) and globally as G5 (rare but not vulnerable). Loss of habitat due to anthropogenic modifications, pesticides and competition with introduced species are considered the major threats to declining or vulnerable gastropod populations in New York State.

=== Nonindigenous distribution ===
The first record of Gillia altilis in the Great Lakes drainage was from Oneida Lake, New York State, around 1915–1918. However, in subsequent years it was likely extirpated from this water body.

Gillia altilis was able to colonize the Lake Ontario drainage basin by means of the Erie Canal system in New York State, which connects this part of the Great Lakes with the Hudson River. The snail was later recorded from Niagara-on-the-Lake, Lake Ontario, in 1936, and in the Erie Canal at various times before 1940. Gillia altilis is considered established in the Lake Ontario drainage.

The New York State Department of Environmental Conservation also reports records from Lake Erie, but gives no references and declares that the current status of this population is unknown.

At this time, there are no recorded negative impacts in the Great Lakes system. There are also no known impacts in other water bodies at present.

== Ecology ==
=== Habitat ===
Gillia altilis is usually found in freshwater stream environments. Its globose shell is adapted for inhabiting high-velocity lotic environments (rheophile animal), because it allows for a large, muscular foot that can suction to rocks. However, relatives of this species, with the same globose shell and large foot, are well adapted to living on silty substrates because the large foot prevents the snail from sinking. In fact, it is not uncommon for Gillia altilis to inhabit both stagnant waters in lakes and streams and rapidly moving waters. In Vermont, it is found in the Hudson River in shoals where there is macrophyte cover and mud substrate. In New York State, it also commonly inhabits warmwater, shallow lacustrine habitats with mud substrate.

=== Feeding habits ===
This snail has a radula that is specialized, exhibiting overall larger but fewer cones and cusps on the various teeth, which are adapted for grazing on coarser food particles than are eaten by related snails in the subfamily Lithoglyphinae.

=== Life cycle ===
Gillia altilis exhibits separate sexes. Sperm is transmitted to the female through a penis that extends from the nape of the male. This species lays its eggs in hemisphere-shaped capsules, singly or in clumps up to six at a time, on leaves and stems of macrophytes (or stones and leaf litter).

The egg capsules are ~1.25 mm in diameter.
