= Somatogyrus =

Scientific classification
- Domain: Eukaryota
- Kingdom: Animalia
- Phylum: Mollusca
- Class: Gastropoda
- Subclass: Caenogastropoda
- Order: Littorinimorpha
- Family: Lithoglyphidae
- Subfamily: Lithoglyphinae
- Genus: Somatogyrus; Gill, 1863

Genus of gastropods

Somatogyrus is a genus of very small freshwater and brackish water snails that have an operculum, aquatic gastropod micromolluscs in the family Lithoglyphidae.

== Species ==
Species within the genus Somatogyrus include:

- Reverse pebblesnail, Somatogyrus alcoviensis Krieger, 1972
- Somatogyrus aldrichi B. Walker, 1906 (W)
- Ouachita pebblesnail, †Somatogyrus amnicoloides B. Walker, 1915
- Golden pebblesnail, Somatogyrus aureus Tryon, 1865
- Angular pebblesnail, Somatogyrus biangulatus B. Walker, 1906
- Knotty pebblesnail, Somatogyrus constrictus B. Walker, 1904
- Coosa pebblesnail, Somatogyrus coosaensis B. Walker, 1904
- Thick-lipped pebblesnail, †Somatogyrus crassilabris B. Walker, 1915
- Stocky pebblesnail, Somatogyrus crassus B. Walker, 1904
- Tennessee pebblesnail, Somatogyrus currierianus (I. Lea, 1863)
- Hidden pebblesnail, Somatogyrus decipiens B. Walker, 1909
- Sandbar pebblesnail, Somatogyrus depressus (Tryon, 1862)
- Ovate pebblesnail, Somatogyrus excavatus B. Walker, 1906
- Cherokee pebblesnail, Somatogyrus georgianus B. Walker, 1904
- Fluted pebblesnail, Somatogyrus hendersoni B. Walker, 1909
- Granite pebblesnail, Somatogyrus hinkleyi B. Walker, 1904
- Atlas pebblesnail, Somatogyrus humerosus B. Walker, 1906
- Ohio pebblesnail, Somatogyrus integra (Say, 1829)
- Dwarf pebblesnail, Somatogyrus nanus B. Walker, 1904
- Moon pebblesnail, Somatogyrus obtusus B. Walker, 1904
- Sparrow pebblesnail, Somatogyrus parvulus Tryon, 1865
- Shale pebblesnail, Somatogyrus pennsylvanicus B. Walker, 1904
- Tallapoosa pebblesnail, Somatogyrus pilsbryanus B. Walker, 1904
- Compact pebblesnail, Somatogyrus pumilus (Conrad, 1834)
- Pygmy pebblesnail, Somatogyrus pygmaeus B. Walker, 1909
- Quadrate pebblesnail, Somatogyrus quadratus B. Walker, 1906
- Flint pebblesnail, Somatogyrus rheophilas F. G. Thompson, 1984
- Elk pebblesnail, Somatogyrus rosewateri M. E. Gordon, 1986
- Mud pebblesnail, Somatogyrus sargenti Pilsbry, 1895
- Rolling pebblesnail, Somatogyrus strengi Pilsbury & B. Walker, 1906
- Choctaw pebblesnail, Somatogyrus substriatus B. Walker, 1906
- Savannah pebblesnail, Somatogyrus tenax F. G. Thompson, 1969
- Opaque pebblesnail, Somatogyrus tennesseensis B. Walker, 1906
- Somatogyrus trothis W. Doherty, 1878
- Coldwater pebblesnail, Somatogyrus tryoni Pilsbry & F. C. Baker, 1927
- Panhandle pebblesnail, Somatogyrus virginicus B. Walker, 1904
- Gulf Coast pebblesnail, Somatogyrus walkerianus Aldrich, 1905
- Channeled pebblesnail, †Somatogyrus wheeleri B. Walker, 1915

Species brought into synonymy

- Somatogyrus clenchi, synonym of Aroapyrgus clenchi
- Somatogyrus mexicanus, synonym of Aroapyrgus mexicanus
- Somatogyrus subglobosus, synonym of Birgella subglobosa
- †Somatogyrus umbilicatus, synonym of †Clappia umbilicata

NB: WoRMS considers one more species than ITIS. It is marked (W) in the list above.
