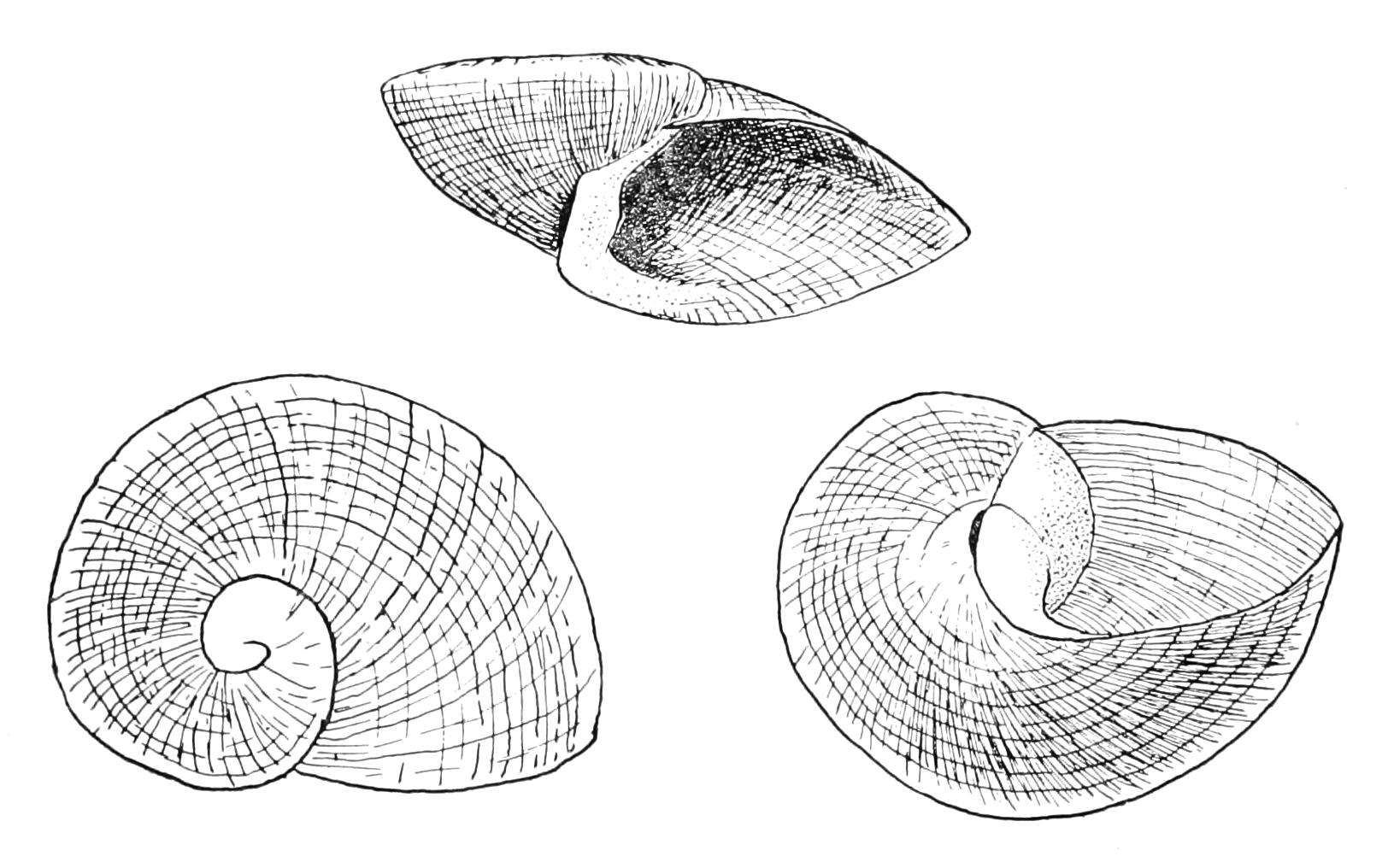
- Three views of a shell of Neoplanorbis tantillus oriented as if it were a dextral shell. (All planorbids are in fact sinistral.)

Conservation status
- Extinct (IUCN 3.1)

- Presumed Extinct (NatureServe)

Scientific classification
- Kingdom: Animalia
- Phylum: Mollusca
- Class: Gastropoda
- Superorder: Hygrophila
- Family: Planorbidae
- Genus: †Neoplanorbis
- Species: †N. tantillus

Binomial name
- †Neoplanorbis tantillus Pilsbry, 1906

= Neoplanorbis tantillus =

Species of gastropod

Neoplanorbis tantillus was a species of very small air-breathing freshwater snail, an aquatic gastropod mollusk in the family Planorbidae, the ram's horn snails. This species was endemic to the United States. In 2012, it was declared extinct by the IUCN Red List of Threatened Species.

The shell of this species appeared to be dextral in coiling, but as is the case in all planorbids, the shell was actually sinistral. The shell was carried upside down with the aperture on the right, and this made it appear to be dextral.

== Original description ==
Species Neoplanorbis tantillus was originally described by Henry Augustus Pilsbry in 1906.

Type locality is Coosa River near or in Wetumpka, Alabama.

Pilsbry's original text (the type description) reads as follows:

Neoplanorbis tantillus n. sp. PI. III, figs. 3, 4, 5.

Shell very narrowly perforate, slightly convex above, very convex below, with a strongly projecting rounded keel at the periphery; light brown; surface slightly shining, sculptured with very obliquely radial growth-lines and raised spiral stride, rather coarse for a shell of this size. Whorls 2, rapidly enlarging, the apex somewhat sunken; first whorl very convex, the second much less so, slowly descending in front. Aperture very oblique, shaped like a gothic-arched door, the upper and lower margins arcuate, the outer margin angular, the columellar margin dilated, straight and vertical, with a rather wide whitish callus within. Alt. .8, diam. 1.7 mm.

The specimens occurred at Wetumpka, Alabama with the preceding species. This is one of the smallest fresh-water mollusks yet found in America.

Note: "preceding species" in the description means Amphigyra alabamensis, because these two species were newly described in the same work.
