= Henry Hemphill =

American malacologist

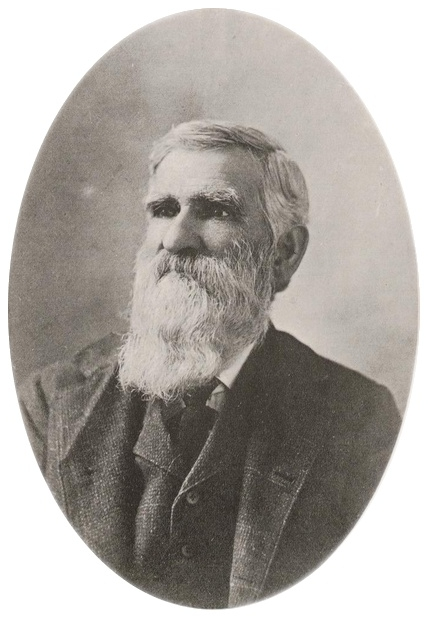
- Born: 1830; Wilmington, Delaware
- Died: July 24, 1914 (aged 84); Oakland, California

Henry Hemphill (1830–1914) was an American malacologist, a biologist who studies mollusks. In particular he studied land and freshwater mollusca.

His collection of land, freshwater, and marine mollusks became holdings of the California Academy of Sciences and Stanford University.

He was born in Delaware in 1830. He worked as a bricklayer in San Diego 1865, after making gold prospecting trips in the western states. He collected mollusks as early as 1861. He published catalogues of shells for sale from the 1870s to 1890. He moved to Oakland around 1909. He died in 1914 on July 24 as a result of contact with arsenic.

He sold and sent out material labeled with unpublished names, and introduced varieties and formal names. He often used vague terms to describe the locality of specimens.

== Taxa ==
He named and described many molluscan taxa, including:

- Fluminicola columbiana Hemphill in Pilsbry, 1899 - a freshwater snail
- Helminthoglypta walkeriana (Hemphill, 1911)

A number of taxa were named after Hemphill, including:

- Hemphillia Bland & Binney, 1872, a land slug genus
