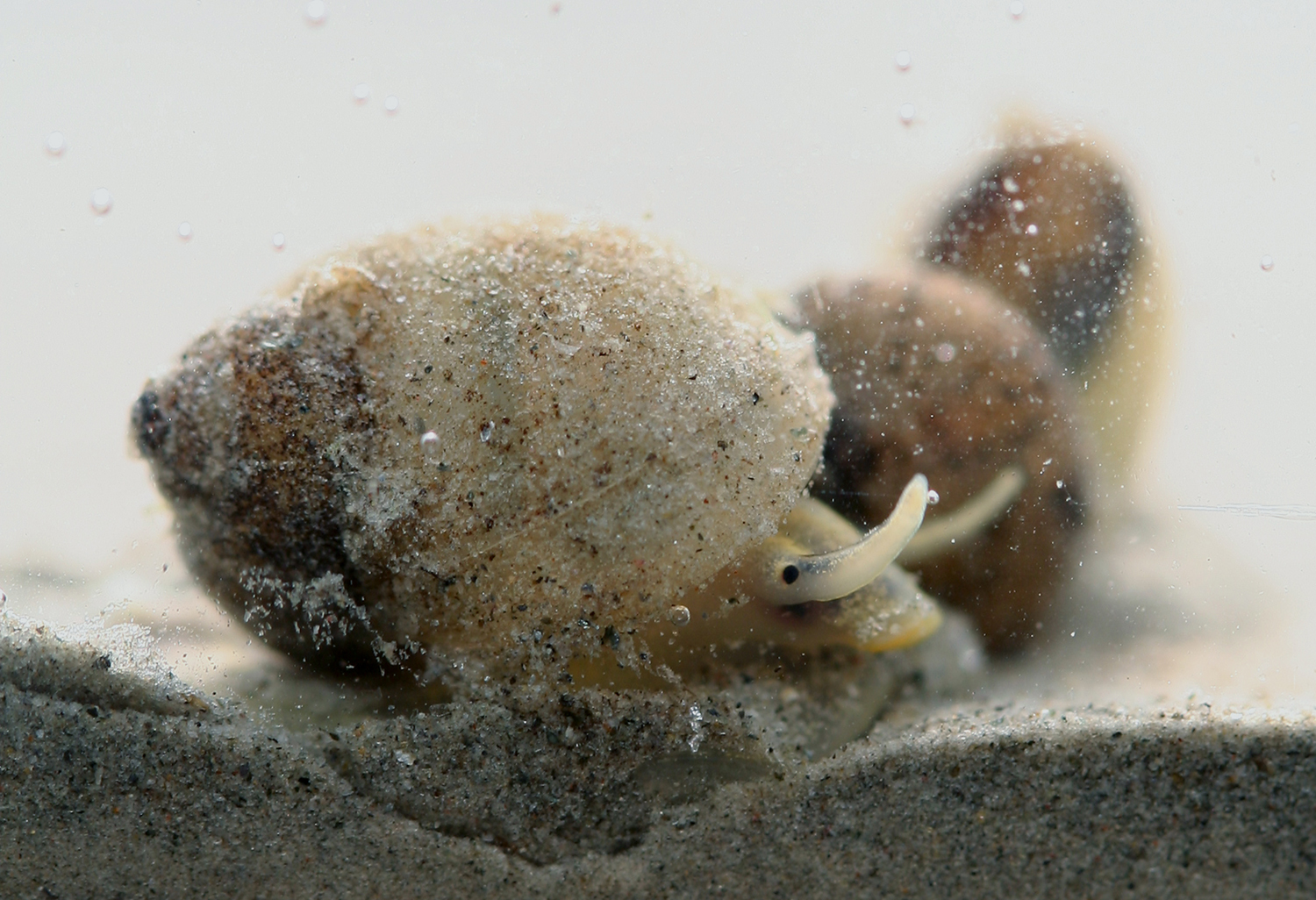
- Live individuals of Lithoglyphus naticoides

Conservation status
- Least Concern (IUCN 3.1)

Scientific classification
- Kingdom: Animalia
- Phylum: Mollusca
- Class: Gastropoda
- Subclass: Caenogastropoda
- Order: Littorinimorpha
- Family: Lithoglyphidae
- Genus: Lithoglyphus
- Species: L. naticoides

Binomial name
- Lithoglyphus naticoides (C. Pfeiffer, 1828)

Synonyms
- Paludina naticoides C. Pfeiffer, 1828

= Lithoglyphus naticoides =

Lithoglyphus naticoides Temporal range: Pliocene-Recent

Species of gastropod

Lithoglyphus naticoides, the gravel snail, is a species of small or minute freshwater snail with an operculum, an aquatic gastropod mollusk in the family Lithoglyphidae.

Lithoglyphus naticoides is the type species of the genus Lithoglyphus.

== Distribution ==
The distribution of Lithoglyphus naticoides in the Pliocene ranged from Western Europe to Western Siberia. Its distribution subsequently shrank to the Ponto-Azov area during cooler eras.

The distribution of this species is Pontic. The native distribution includes only Black Sea rivers and the Danube up to Regensburg, from southeastern to central Europe.

It has also artificially colonized other parts of Europe. After 1800 it was introduced to the Elbe and Rhine regions.

After 1960 it has become almost extinct due to water pollution in central Europe.

This snail is found in the following countries:

Western Europe:

- Netherlands
- France

Central Europe:

- Austria
- Czech Republic - endangered in Moravia
- Germany - high endangered (Stark gefährdet) It is critically endangered in Sachsen-Anhalt and in Baden-Württemberg.
- Poland - endangered, non-indigenous
- Slovakia

Eastern Europe:

- Latvia
- Lithuania
- Belarus
- Ukraine
- Russia It was found in the delta of Volga river in 1971. It has spread upstream since 1971 inhabiting also reservoirs including: Volgograd Reservoir, Saratov Reservoir, Kuybyshev Reservoir and Gorky Reservoir.
- Turkey

Asia:

- Bukhtarminskoe Reservoir on the Irtysh River in Kazakhstan It has reached population densities of 700 snails per m^{2} there.

North America:

- Great Lakes

== Description ==
This species is called "naticoides" because in shape and general appearance the shell and the operculum of this species is reminiscent of the shell and the operculum of the marine moon snails or Naticidae (for example, the Northern moon snail).

The shell is globular, light grey to greenish yellow or dark. The shell has 4.5-5 whorls. The last whorl is predominating. Dimensions of the shell are 7–10 mm × 7–10 mm. Or the width of the shell is 6.5–8 mm. The height of the shell is 7–9 mm.

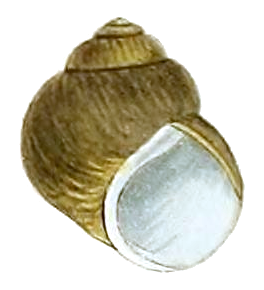
Drawing of apertural view of a shell

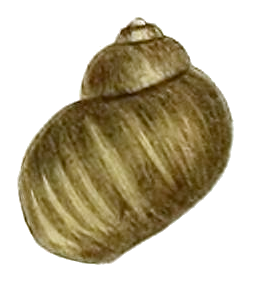
Drawing of abapertural view of a shell

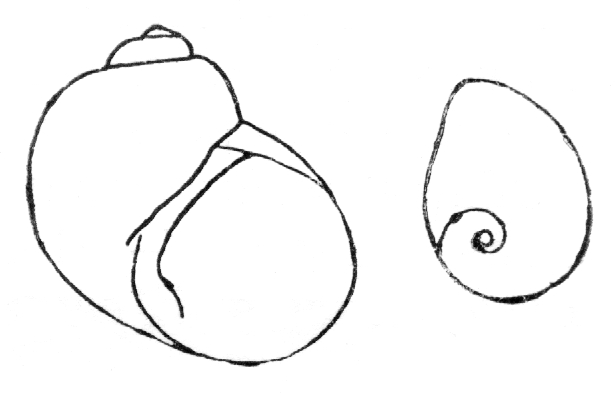
Outline drawing of a shell of Lithoglyphus naticoides and its operculum

The animal has a broad foot. Males are often smaller than females.

== Ecology ==
It lives in rivers, lakes, channels and reservoirs. In rivers, it lives at sites with low water currents, on solid muddy soils and at stones. It requires high oxygen and calcium carbonate contents. The population diversity reached up to 3.300 snails per m^{2} according to Krause (1949). It can live in salinity up to 3 ‰.

Lithoglyphus naticoides feeds on diatomes and green algae.

The life cycle of Lithoglyphus naticoides takes one year. Reproduction of Lithoglyphus naticoides takes place mainly in July. The morphology of the egg capsules has been described by Berezkina (2010). The life span is 4–5 years.

Parasites of Lithoglyphus naticoides include:

- It serves as the first intermediate host for Nicolla skrjabini (Iwanitzki, 1928)
- It serves as the first intermediate host for Apophallus muehlingi (Jägerskiöld, 1898)
- It serves as an intermediate host for Apophallus donicus (Skrjabin & Lindtrop, 1919).

== Human use ==
Perforated shells of Lithoglyphus naticoides were found in a Neolithic grave in Lower Austria as a head decoration.
