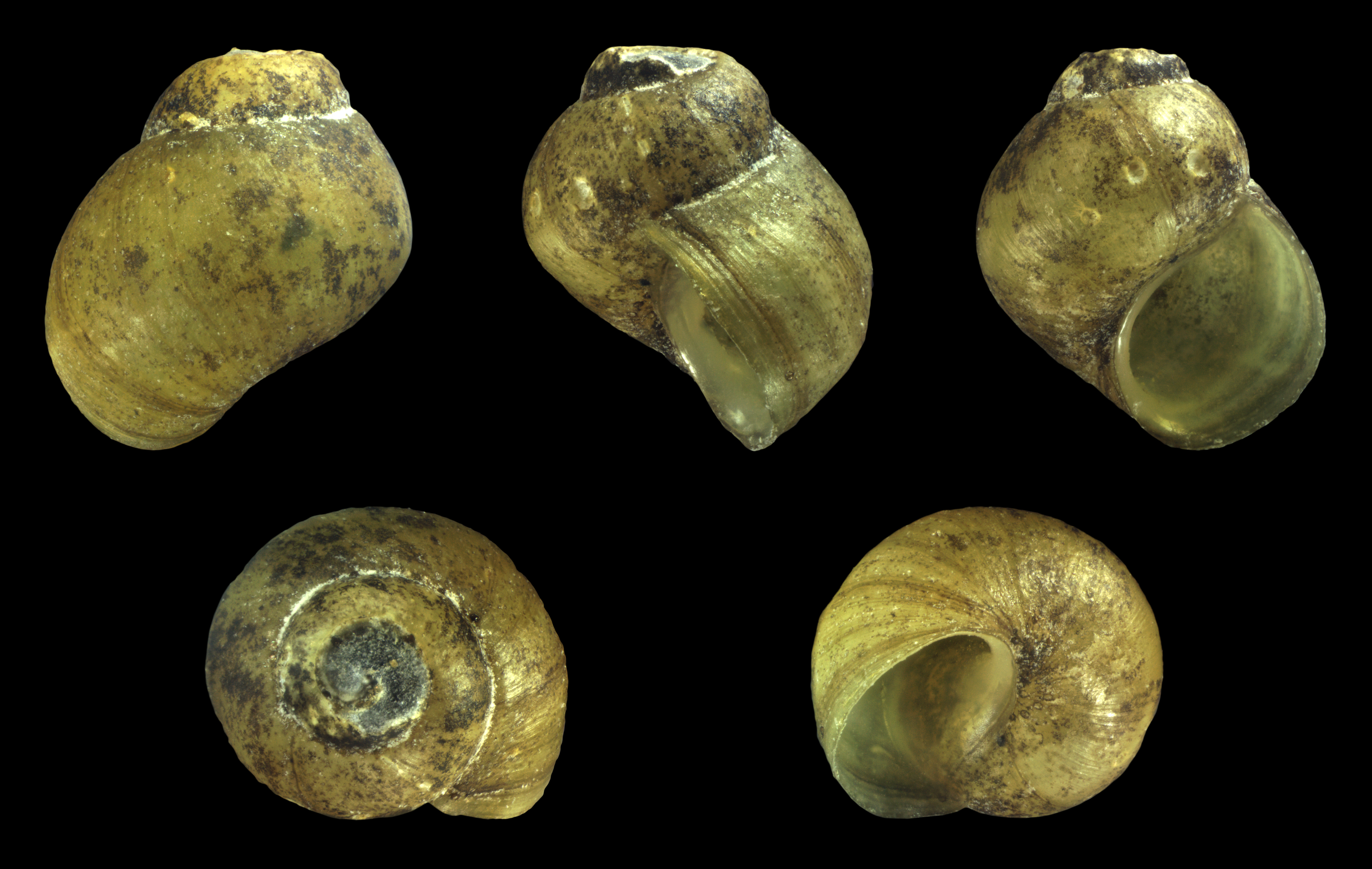
- Fluminicola seminalis (Hinds, 1842)

Scientific classification
- Kingdom: Animalia
- Phylum: Mollusca
- Class: Gastropoda
- Subclass: Caenogastropoda
- Order: Littorinimorpha
- Superfamily: Truncatelloidea
- Family: Lithoglyphidae
- Subfamily: Lithoglyphinae
- Genus: Fluminicola; Carpenter, 1864

Type species
- Paludina nuttalliana I. Lea, 1838

Species
- See text

Synonyms
- Fluminicola (Fluminicola) Carpenter, 1864; Heathilla Hannibal, 1912

= Fluminicola (gastropod) =

Genus of gastropods

Fluminicola is a genus of minute freshwater snails with an operculum, aquatic gastropod molluscs or micromolluscs in the family Lithoglyphidae.

== Species ==
Species within the genus Fluminicola include:

- Fluminicola avernalis Pilsbry, 1935 - Moapa pebblesnail
- Fluminicola coloradoensis Morrison, 1940 - Green River pebblesnail
- Fluminicola columbiana Hemphill, 1899 - Columbia pebblesnail
- Fluminicola dalli (Call, 1884) - Pyramid Lake pebblesnail
- Fluminicola erythopoma Pilsbry, 1899 - ash meadows pebblesnail
- Fluminicola fuscus (Haldeman, 1847) - ashy pebblesnail
- Fluminicola hindsi (Baird, 1863) - vagrant pebblesnail
- Fluminicola merriami (Pilsbry & Beecher, 1892) - pahranagat pebblesnail
- Fluminicola minutissimus Pilsbry, 1907 - pixie pebblesnail
- Fluminicola modoci Hannibal, 1912 - Modoc pebblesnail
- Fluminicola nevadensis Walker, 1916 - cortez hills pebblesnail
- Fluminicola nuttallianus (I. Lea, 1838) - dusky pebblesnail, type species
- Fluminicola seminalis (Hinds, 1842) - nugget pebblesnail
- Fluminicola tenuis Pilsbry
- Fluminicola turbiniformis (Tryon, 1865) - turban pebblesnail
- Fluminicola virens (I. Lea, 1838) - Olympia pebblesnail
