= Manitou Cave =

- Location within Alabama
- Coordinates: 34°25′44.0394″N 85°43′26.04″W
- Access: Private tours only
- Show cave opened: 1888
- Website

Alabama Register of Landmarks and Heritage
- Designated: August 6, 1976

Manitou Cave is a cave in Alabama, near the town of Fort Payne, in the side of Lookout Mountain. In the early 1800s, the Fort Payne area was a Cherokee settlement named Willstown. This was the home of Sequoyah during his time of creating the Cherokee syllabary. Later, Sequoyah's son wrote on the walls of Manitou Cave using this syllabary, documenting ceremonial events and other culturally significant information and history. In the 1830s, Cherokee people were forcibly relocated from this area along the Trail of Tears, leaving the cave empty for some time. During the Civil War, the cave was a source of saltpeter for the Confederate Army. The mineral was mined by laborers to provide the essential ingredient for black powder. The cave was also designated fallout shelter during the Cold War.

In 1888, Manitou Cave was opened by the Fort Payne Coal and Iron Company and became a tourist destination. Management of Manitou Cave later shifted to the Walter B. Raymond Sr. family, who operated it through the mid-1970s. It closed as a tourist attraction in 1979. For many years Manitou Cave was neglected and closed to the public.

In 2015, Manitou Cave was purchased and a 501(c)3 non-profit, Manitou Cave of Alabama, was founded by Annette Reynolds to protect and conserve the cave and surrounding property. Repairs, renovations, and conservation efforts followed, including the installation of an eco-friendly cave gate for safety and security. The Eastern Band of Cherokee Indians helped to secure the gate's purchase. During these conservation and revitalization efforts, the Manitou Cave Snail, called the Antrobis brewerii, was confirmed to still exist in the cave, making Manitou Cave the only place it is known to exist in the world.

In 2021, Manitou Cave received certification as a Trail of Tears National Historic Trail Interpretive Center from The National Park Service National Historic Trail Office, Sante Fe, NM.

As of 2022, Manitou Cave of AL, Inc. stewards the cave with a mission is "to respect and protect this historic, sacred site through conservation and education so that the cave, land, and water are preserved for visitors and wildlife as a place of peace." To preserve the cave as a living record of history and to protect the fragile ecosystem, public access is limited to annual community tours a couple times a year and educational research.
