= Władysław Dybowski =

Polish zoologist (1838–1910)

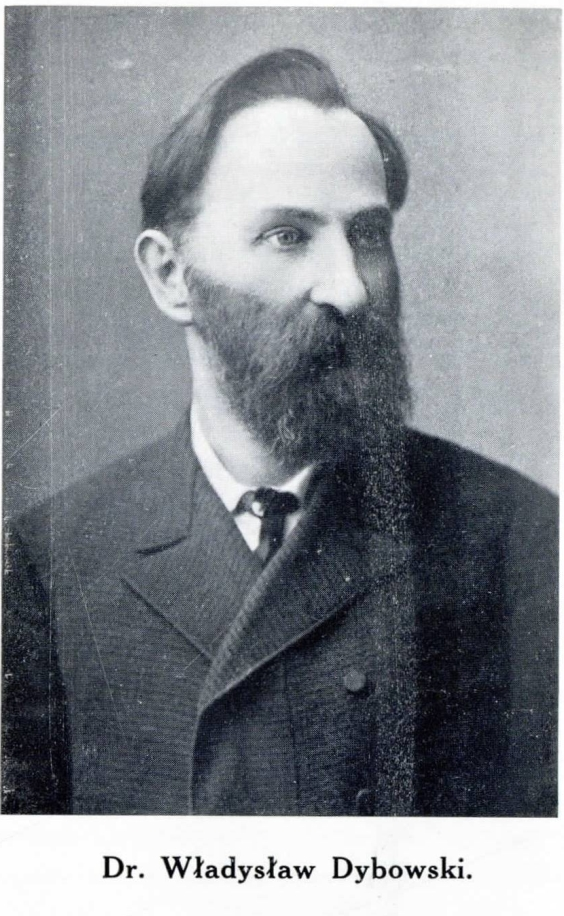
- Born: April 18, 1838; Adamaryna, Minsk Governorate, Russian Empire
- Died: August 27, 1910 (aged 72); Wojnowie, Minsk Governorate, Russian Empire
- Education: University of Dorpat
- Known for: Study of molluscs
- Awards: Gold medal for dissertation on Silurian bryozoa and anthozoa
- Scientific career
- Fields: Zoology
- Workplaces: University of Dorpat

Władysław Dybowski (18 April 1838 – 27 August 1910) was a Polish zoologist, and a brother of Benedykt Dybowski. He mainly studied invertebrates, and specialized in the study of molluscs, including fossil species. He also worked on specimens sent by his brother from Siberia.

Dybowski was born in Adamaryna, Minsk Governorate to Jan and Salomei née Przysiecka and studied at the Minsk Litewski gymnasium before going to the University of Dorpat. He received a gold medal for his dissertation on Silurian bryozoa and anthozoa. He received a PhD in 1878 for work on Silurian worms. He then lectured at the university before being forced by health problems to the estate of Umiastowski Niaňków in Niańkowo, Nowogródek in 1878. His brother Benedykt Dybowksi supplied him with specimens from Siberia, mainly aquatic invertebrates. Several new molluscs were described by Dybowski. From 1900 his heath deteriorated and he was taken care of by his sister Malwina Nargielewicz at Wojnowie where he lived until his death.
