= Little Wills Valley =

Valley in Alabama, United States of America

Coordinates: 34.0220°N 86.0772°W

Little Wills Valley is a valley in DeKalb County, Alabama. It was named after Chief Little Wills, a Native American.
