= Bryant Walker =

American malacologist

- Born: 1856
- Died: 1936 (aged 79–80)
- Scientific career
- Fields: malacology

Bryant Walker (1856–1936) was an American malacologist who specialized in the non-marine Mollusca. He mainly studied the freshwater mollusks of the USA, in particular those of Michigan. He published many papers on the Unionida, an order of freshwater mussels.

== Taxa ==
Walker named numerous taxa of freshwater gastropods and bivalves, including:

Gastropods

- Camptoceras hirasei Walker, 1919
- Neoplanorbis carinatus Walker, 1908
- †Neoplanorbis smithii Walker, 1908

== Publications ==
A partial list of his publications:

- Ortmann, A.E., and B. Walker 1912. A new North American naiad. Nautilus 25(9):97-100 + 1 plate.
- Ortmann, A.E., and B. Walker 1922. A new genus and species of American naiades. Nautilus 36(1):1-6 + 1 plate.
- Ortmann, A.E., and B. Walker. 1922. On the nomenclature of certain North American naiades. Occasional Papers of the Museum of Zoology, University of Michigan No. 112. 75 pp.
- Walker, B. 1879. Catalogue of the shell-bearing Mollusca of Michigan. Journal of Conchology 1879:325-337.
- Walker, B. 1889. On the occurrence of Unio complanatus Sol., in Michigan. Nautilus 3(1):16-17.
- Walker, B. 1891. Unio complanatus Sol. in northern Michigan. Nautilus 5(8):93.
- Walker, B. 1892. The shell bearing Mollusca of Michigan. Nautilus 6(2):13-19; 6(3):31-35; 6(4):42-47; 6(6):63-67.
- Walker, B. 1892. Notes on Unio luteolus Lam. Nautilus 6(8):94.
- Walker, B. 1893. The shell bearing Mollusca of Michigan. (cont.) Nautilus 6(12):135-141.
- Walker, B. 1894. Shells of the Saginaw Valley, Michigan. Nautilus 7(11):125-129.
- Walker, B. (1894–1895). A review of our present knowledge of the molluscan fauna of Michigan. Thomas Smith Press, Detroit, Michigan. 27 pp. [Reprinted in Sterkiana 1965. 17:10-25]
- Walker, B. 1895. A month with the Michigan Fish Commission. Nautilus 9(1):2-6.
- Walker, B. 1895. A review of our present knowledge of the molluscan fauna of Michigan. Thomas Smith Press, Detroit, Michigan. 27 pp.
- Walker, B. 1896 A biological examination of Lake Michigan in the Traverse Bay region. Appendix V. Report on the Mollusca collected in the vicinity of Charlevoix, Michigan, in the summer of 1894. Bulletin of the Michigan Fisheries Commission. (6):96-99.
- Walker, B. 1896. Report upon the Mollusca collected in the vicinity of Carlevoix, Michigan, in the summer of 1894. Bulletin of the Michigan Fisheries Commission. Appendix. pp. 96–99.
- Walker, B. 1898. The distribution of the Unionidae in Michigan. Bryant Walker, Detroit, Michigan. 23 pp.
- Walker, B. 1899. The terrestrial Mollusca of Michigan. 27 pp.
- Walker, B. 1900. The origin and distribution of the land and freshwater Mollusca of North America. Michigan Academy of Science 1:43-61.
- Walker, B. 1901. A new species of Strophitus. Nautilus 15(6):65-66 + 1 plate.
- Walker, B. 1904. Hints on collecting land and fresh-water Mollusca. Journal of Applied Microscopy and Laboratory Methods 6:2365-2368.
- Walker, B. 1905. List of shells from northwestern Florida. Nautilus 18(12):133-136 + 1 plate.
- Walker, B. 1905. A new species of Medionidus. Nautilus 18(12):136-137 + 1 plate.
- Walker, B. 1906. New and little known species of Amnicolidae. Nautilus 19(10):114-117.
- Walker, B. 1906. Notes on Valvata. Nautilus 20(3):25-32 + 1 plate.
- Walker, B. 1906. A list of shells from Nebraska. Nautilus 20(7):81-83.
- Walker, B. 1908. New species of Ancylidae. Nautilus 21(12):138-140 + 1 plate.
- Walker, B. 1909. Annotated list of the Mollusca of Isle Royale, Michigan. Annual Report of the Geological Survey of Michigan 1908:281-298.
- Walker, B. 1910. On the validity of Unio undatus Barnes. Nautilus 24(1):6-10; 24(2):16-24 + 2 plates.
- Walker, B. 1910. A new Spatha. Nautilus 24(4):38-39 + 1 plate.
- Walker, B. 1910. Description of a new species of Truncilla. Nautilus 24(4):42-44 + 1 plate.
- Walker, B. 1910. Notes on Truncilla, with a key to the species. Nautilus 24(7):75-81.
- Walker, B. 1910. The distribution of Margaritana margaritifera (Linn.) in North America. Proceedings of the Malacological Society of London 9(2):126-145.

Walker, B. 1911. Note on the distribution of Margaritana monodonta Say. Nautilus 25(5):57-58.

- Walker, B. 1913. The Unione fauna of the Great Lakes. Nautilus 27(2):18-23; 27(3):29-34; 27(4):40-47; 27(5):56-59.
- Walker, B. 1915. Pleurobema missouriensis Marsh. Nautilus 28(12):140-141 + 1 plate.
- Walker, B. 1915. Unio viridis Conrad. Nautilus 29(7):74-78.
- Walker, B. 1915. Results of the Mershon Expedition to the Charity Islands, Lake Huron. Occasional Papers of the Museum of Zoology, University of Michigan No. 7. 7 pp.
- Walker, B. 1916. Pleurobema lewisii (Lea). Nautilus 29(10):114-116.
- Walker, B. 1916. The Rafinesque-Poulson Unios. Nautilus 30(4):43-47.
- Walker, B. 1916. The Mollusca collected in northeastern Nevada by the Walker-Newcomb Expedition of the University of Michigan. Occasional Papers of the Museum of Zoology, University of Michigan No. 29. 8 pp.
- Walker, B. 1917. A revision of the classification of the North American patelliform Ancylidae with descriptions of new species. Nautilus 31(1):1-10 + 3 plates.
- Walker, B. 1917. The method of evolution in the Unionidae. Occasional Papers of the Museum of Zoology, University of Michigan No. 45. 10 pp.
- Walker, B. 1918. The Unione fauna of Alabama. (Abstract). Michigan Academy of Science 20:137-138.
- Walker, B. 1918. A synopsis of the classification of the freshwater Mollusca of North America, North of Mexico, and a catalogue of the more recently described species, with notes. Miscellaneous Publications, Museum of Zoology, University of Michigan 6:1-213.
- Walker, B. 1918. Notes on North American naides. I. Occasional Papers of the Museum of Zoology, University of Michigan No. 49. 6 pp.
- Walker, B. 1918. The Mollusca. pp. 957–1020 in H.B. Ward and G.C. Whipple (eds.). Fresh-water Biology. 1st edition. 1111 pp.
- Walker, B. 1919. Notes on North American naiades. II. Occasional Papers of the Museum of Zoology, University of Michigan No. 74. 8 pp. + 2 plates.
- Walker, B. 1920. The distribution of the Unionidae in Alaska and British America. (Abstract). Michigan Academy of Science 21:115-116.
- Walker, B. 1920. Monograph of the naiades of Pennsylvania, Part III. (Review). Nautilus 34(1):32-35.
- Walker, B. 1920 Anson A. Hinkley. Nautilus 34(2):55-57 + 1 plate.
- Walker, B. 1924. Two new naiades from Nicaragua. Nautilus 38(2):51-54 + 1 plate.
- Walker, B. 1925. A new species of Micromya. Occasional Papers of the Museum of Zoology, University of Michigan No. 163. 6 pp. + 1 plate.
- Walker, B. 1928. The date of publication of Unio dombeyanus Val. Nautilus 41(4):131.
- Wright, B.H., and B. Walker. 1902. Checklist of North American Naiades. Detroit, printed for the authors. 19 pp.
