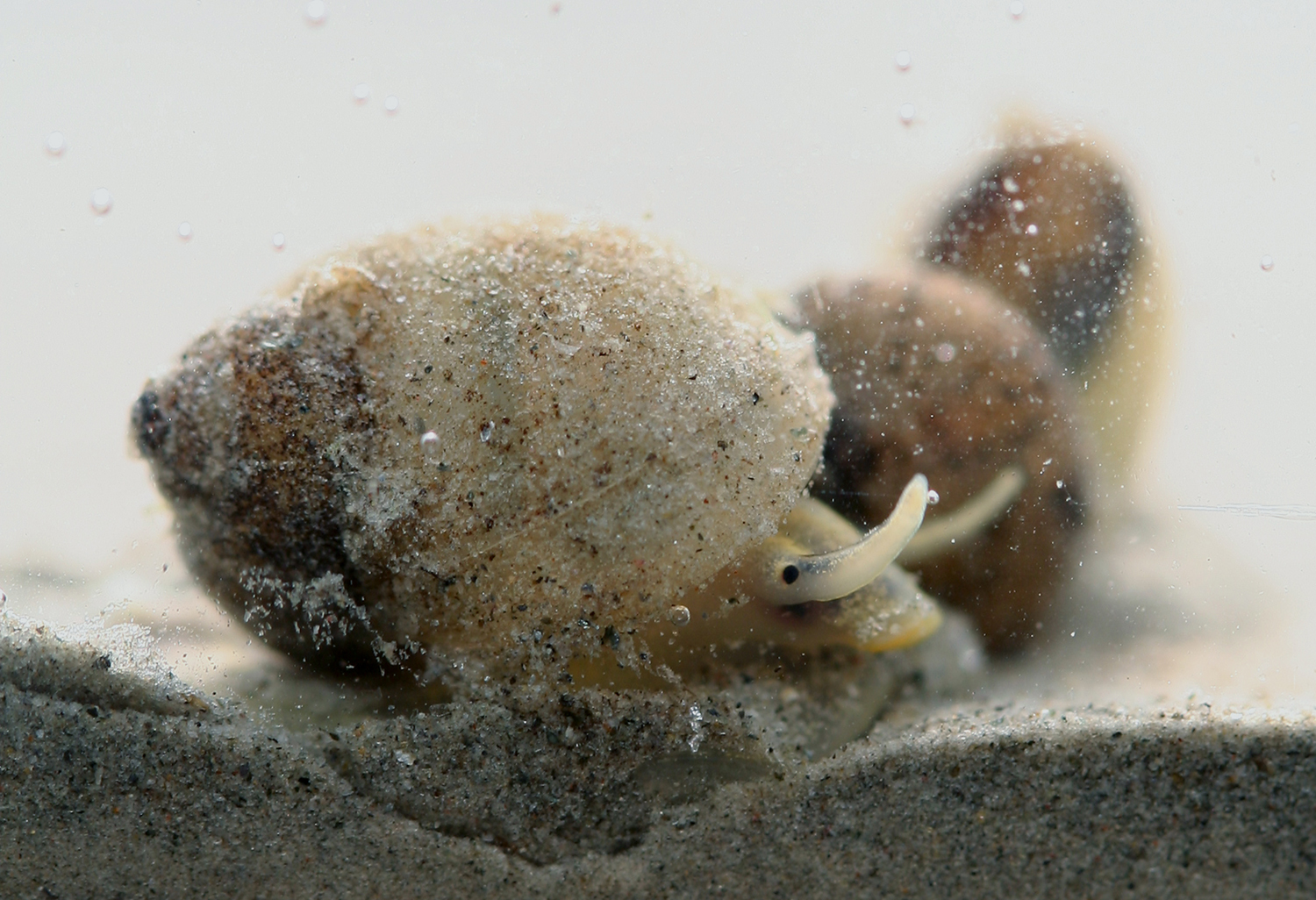
- Live Lithoglyphus naticoides

Scientific classification
- Kingdom: Animalia
- Phylum: Mollusca
- Class: Gastropoda
- Subclass: Caenogastropoda
- Order: Littorinimorpha
- Superfamily: Truncatelloidea
- Family: Lithoglyphidae; Tryon, 1866

= Lithoglyphidae =

Family of gastropods

Lithoglyphidae is a family of small freshwater snails with gills and an operculum, aquatic gastropod mollusks.

This family is in the superfamily Truncatelloidea and in the clade Littorinimorpha (according to the taxonomy of the Gastropoda by Bouchet & Rocroi, 2005).

== Taxonomy ==
Taylor (1966), Ponder & Warén (1988) and Kabat & Hershler (1993) considered this taxon as a subfamily Lithoglyphinae within Hydrobiidae. Radoman (1983) considered Lithoglyphidae as a separate family. Bernasconi (1992) considered this taxon as a tribe Lithoglyphini in the Hydrobiinae within Hydrobiidae.

=== 2005 taxonomy ===
The family Lithoglyphidae consists of 2 subfamilies according to the taxonomy of the Gastropoda by Bouchet & Rocroi, 2005. It follows Wilke et al. (2001), Hausdorf et al. (2003) and includes Lepyriidae according to Thompson (1984).

- subfamily Lithoglyphinae Tryon, 1866 - synonyms: Fluminicolinae Clessin, 1880; Lepyriidae Pilsbry & Olsson, 1951
- subfamily Benedictiinae Clessin, 1880

== Genera ==
- Subfamily Benedictiinae
  - Benedictia W. Dybowski, 1875
    - Benedictia (Baicalocochlea) Lindholm, 1927
    - Benedictia (Benedictia) W. Dybowski, 1875
  - Kobeltocochlea Lindholm, 1909
  - Pseudobenedictia Sitnikova, 1987
  - Yaroslawiella Sitnikova, 2001
- Subfamily Lithoglyphinae
  - Antrorbis Hershler & Thompson, 1990
  - Clappia Walker, 1909
  - Dabriana Radoman, 1974
  - Fluminicola Stimpson, 1865, synonymised with:
    - Fluminicola (Gillia) Stimpson, 1865
    - Heathilla Hannibal, 1912
  - Gillia Stimpson, 1865
  - Holsingeria Hershler, 1989
  - Lepyrium Dall, 1896
  - Lithoglyphus C. Pfeiffer, 1828
  - Phreatodrobia Hershler & Longley, 1986
  - Pristinicola Hershler, Frest, Johannes, Bowler & F. G. Thompson, 1994
  - Pterides Pilsbry, 1909
  - Somatogyrus Gill, 1863
