= List of things named after Lusitania =

Location of Lusitania on the Roman Empire

Lusitania was an ancient Iberian Roman province located where modern Portugal (south of the Douro river) and part of western Spain (the present autonomous community of Extremadura and a part of the province of Salamanca) lie. As with the Roman names of many European countries, Lusitania was and is often used as an alternative name for Portugal.

== Terms ==
- Lusophone
- Lusophobia
- Lusitanic
- Lusitanian distribution
- Lusitanian flora

== Political movements ==
- Integralismo Lusitano

== Outer space ==
- HD 45652 (Lusitânia)

== Territories ==
- New Lusitania
- Kingdom of Northern Lusitania

== Geology ==
- Lusitanian Basin

== Ships ==
- Lusitania (1805 ship)
- RMS Lusitania
- SS Lusitania (1871)
- SS Lusitania (1906)

== Sports ==
- Lusitano G.C.
- Lusitano F.C. (Portugal)
- Lusitano F.C. (South Africa)
- Lusitano FCV
- Lusitanos XV
- S.C. Lusitânia
- S.C. Lusitânia (basketball)
- Lusitânia F.C.
- FC Lusitanos
- Luzitano Futebol Clube
- Gremio Lusitano
- US Lusitanos Saint-Maur
- US Créteil-Lusitanos
- Lusitano Stadium
- Tuna Luso Brasileira

== Literature ==
- Os Lusíadas
- Lusitania Sacra
- Luso-Brazilian Review

== Churches ==
- Lusitanian Catholic Orthodox Church
- Lusitanian Catholic Apostolic Evangelical Church

== Military ==
- Loyal Lusitanian Legion

== News agencies ==
- Lusa News Agency

== Animal breeds ==
- Lusitano

== Genera ==
- Lusotitan
- Lusovenator
- Lusitanosaurus
- Lusitanops
- Lusitania (alga)

== Species ==
=== Animals ===
- Lusitanian cownose ray
- Lusitanian toadfish
- Lusitanian pine vole
- Carabus lusitanicus
- Arion lusitanicus
- Ommatissopyrops lusitanicus
- Lusitanops lusitanicus
- Dagetichthys lusitanicus
- Centrophorus lusitanicus
- Iberochondrostoma lusitanicum
- Brachyderes lusitanicus
- Adustomyces lusitanicus
- Odontosiro lusitanicus
- Monotropus lusitanicus
- Messor lusitanicus
- Oxybelus lusitanicus
- Nesticus lusitanicus
- Sphingonotus (Sphingonotus) lusitanicus
- Thorectes lusitanicus
- Ammoecius lusitanicus
- Amphimallon lusitanicum
- Exosoma lusitanicum
- Dorcadion lusitanicum
- Eosentomon lusitanicum
- Zodarion lusitanicum
- Sepidium lusitanicum
- Epaspidoceras lusitanicum
- Tomistoma lusitanicum
- Hydrolagus lusitanicus
- Homalenotus lusitanicus
- Platyderus lusitanicus
- Proasellus lusitanicus
- Polydesmus lusitanicus
- Trogulus lusitanicus

=== Plants ===
- Lusitanian oak
- Narcissus lusitanicus
- Asphodelus lusitanicus
- Cupressus lusitanica
- Kajanthus lusitanicus
- Allium lusitanicum
- Fritillaria lusitanica
- Drosophyllum lusitanicum
- Ophioglossum lusitanicum
- Echium lusitanicum
- Erica lusitanica
- Teucrium lusitanicum
- Hieracium lusitanicum
- Alexandrium lusitanicum
- Echinospartum lusitanicum
- Oedogonium lusitanicum
- Pinguicula lusitanica

=== Fungi ===
- Mucor lusitanicus
- Chlorophyllum lusitanicum
- Clavispora lusitaniae

== Firearms ==
- Lusa submachine gun

== Music ==
- Alma Lusa

== Companies ==
- LusoVU
