= Lusitanops gigasei =

Scientific classification
- Kingdom: Animalia
- Phylum: Mollusca
- Class: Gastropoda
- Subclass: Caenogastropoda
- Order: Neogastropoda
- Superfamily: Conoidea
- Family: Raphitomidae
- Genus: Lusitanops
- Species: L. gigasei

Binomial name
- Lusitanops gigasei Marquet 1998

Extinct species of sea snail

Lusitanops gigasei is an extinct species of sea snail, a marine gastropod mollusk in the family Raphitomidae. Its specific name derives from the paleontologist Paul Gigase, the collector of the fossil specimen designated as the holotype.

== Description ==
The shape and size of Lusitanops gigasei suggests it was a mobile and active predator, capable of hunting and capturing other small marine invertebrates. The pointed spire of the shell may have helped it to penetrate sand and sediment to access prey buried in the seafloor. The shell's prominent apex may have been an adaptation providing extra strength and structural support.

Its shell was thick and sturdy, suggesting that it may have been adapted to living in environments with strong water currents and turbulence. It could reach a length of 6.1 mm, and a diameter of 1.9 mm.

L. gigasei may be a species intermediate between Lusitanops and Xanthodaphne, as it had a combination of characteristics of these two genera. The extant species it most closely resembles is Lusitanops expansus.

== Distribution ==
Fossils of the species were found in Pliocene strata at Kallo, Belgium; age range: 6 to 2.588 Ma.

The holotype L. gigasei specimen was collected from the Oorderen Member, a stratigraphic deposition in shallow water. Extant Lusitanops species are found in very deep water of 1,300–5,000 m (4,300–16,400 ft), apart from the rarely encountered L. expansus, whose specimens have been found at c. 250 m (820 ft).
