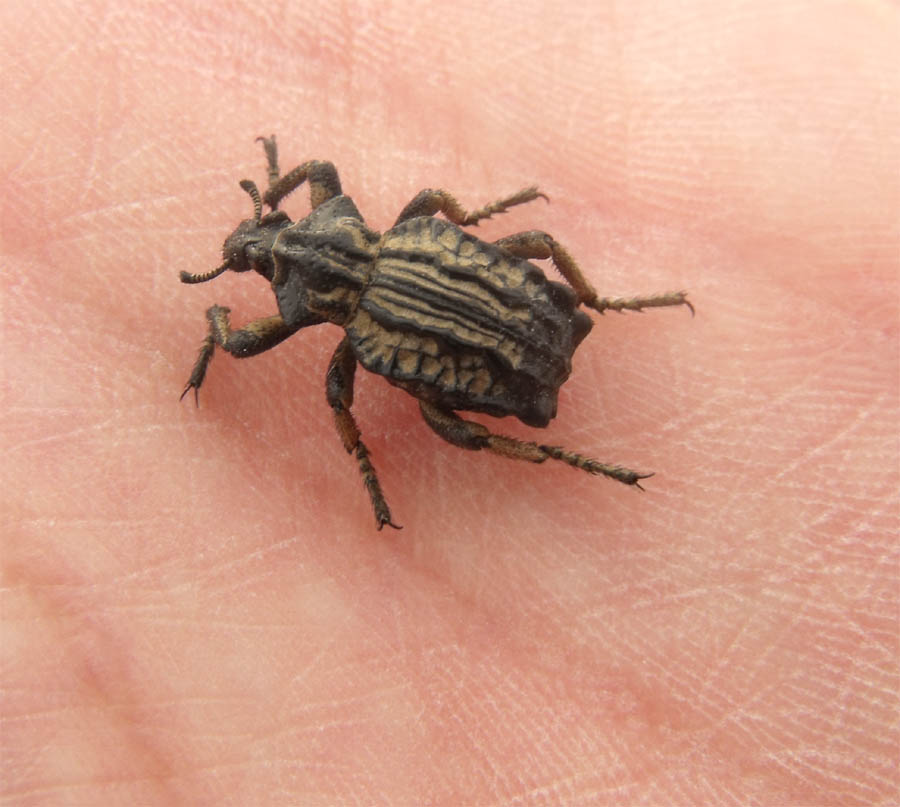
- Brachycerus undatus

Scientific classification
- Domain: Eukaryota
- Kingdom: Animalia
- Phylum: Arthropoda
- Class: Insecta
- Order: Coleoptera
- Suborder: Polyphaga
- Infraorder: Cucujiformia
- Family: Curculionidae
- Subfamily: Entiminae
- Tribe: Brachyderini; Schönherr, 1826

Genera
- See text

= Brachyderini =

Tribe of beetles

The Brachyderini are a weevil tribe in the subfamily Entiminae.

== Genera ==
- Achradidius
- Aedophronus
- Alatavia
- Araxia
- Baladaeus
- Brachyderes
- Caulostrophilus
- Caulostrophus
- Epiphaneus
- Epiphanops
- Hypolagocaulus
- Lagocaulus
- Mecheriostrophus
- Neliocarus
- Neocnemis
- Orophiopsis
- Parafoucartia
- Parapholicodes
- Pelletierius
- Pholicodes
- Podionops
- Proscopus
- Strophocodes
- Strophomorphus
- Strophosoma
- Taphrorhinus
- Thaptogenius
