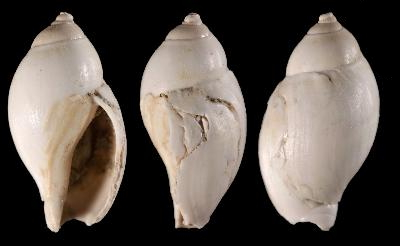
- Shell of Pseudolusitanops bulbiformis (holotype at MNHN, Paris)

Scientific classification
- Kingdom: Animalia
- Phylum: Mollusca
- Class: Gastropoda
- Subclass: Caenogastropoda
- Order: Neogastropoda
- Superfamily: Conoidea
- Family: Raphitomidae
- Genus: †Pseudolusitanops; Lozouet, 2017

Type species
- † Lusitanops bulbiformis Lozouet, 1999

Species
- See text

= Pseudolusitanops =

Extinct genus of sea snails

Pseudolusitanops is an extinct genus of sea snails, marine gastropod mollusks in the family Raphitomidae.

== Species ==
Species within the genus Pseudolusitanops include:

- † Pseudolusitanops bulbiformis (Lozouet, 1999)
