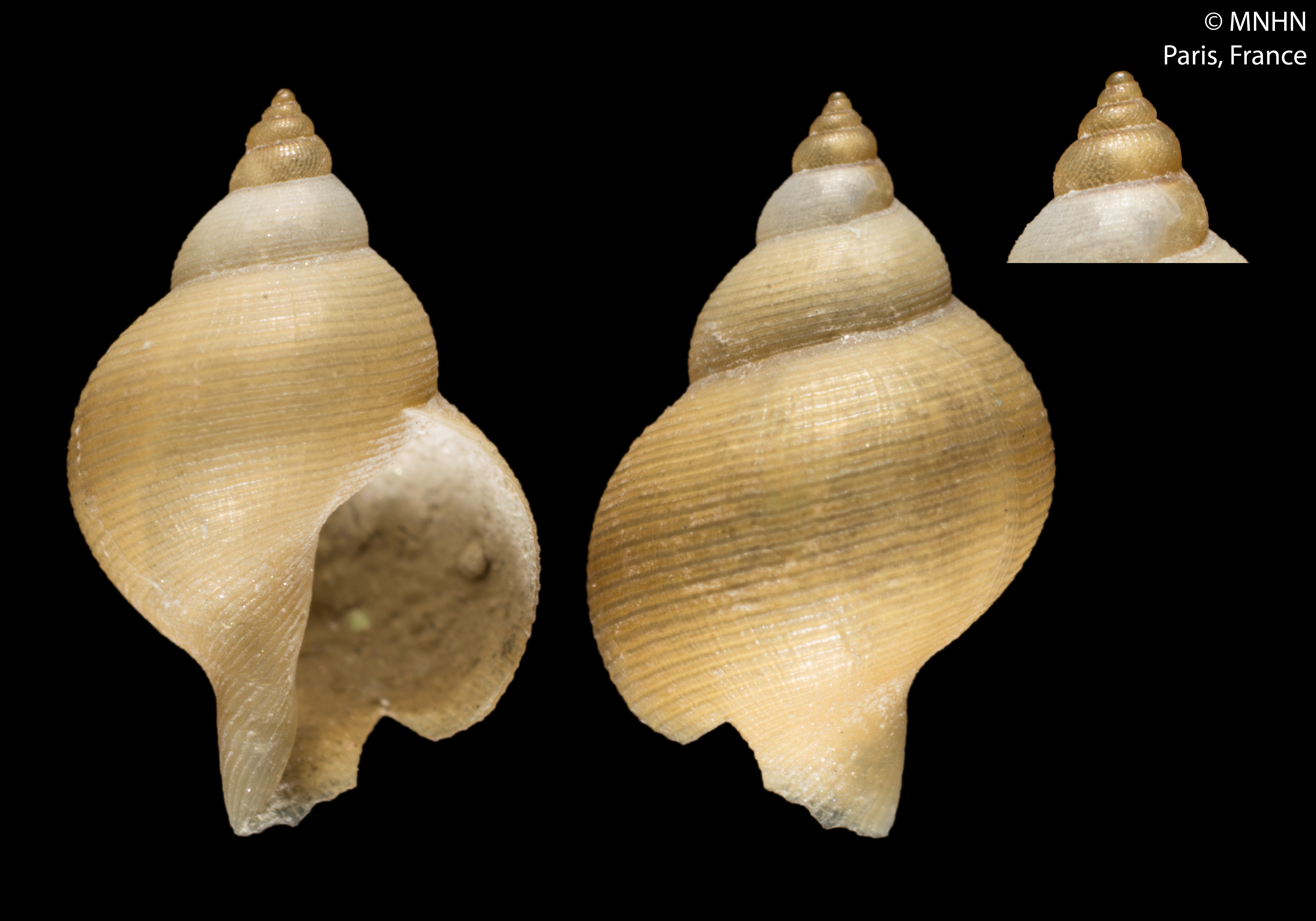
- Shell of Lusitanops cingulatus (holotype at MNHN, Paris)

Scientific classification
- Kingdom: Animalia
- Phylum: Mollusca
- Class: Gastropoda
- Subclass: Caenogastropoda
- Order: Neogastropoda
- Superfamily: Conoidea
- Family: Raphitomidae
- Genus: Lusitanops
- Species: L. cingulatus

Binomial name
- Lusitanops cingulatus Bouchet & Warén, 1980

Synonyms
- Lusitanops cingulata Bouchet & Warén, 1980

= Lusitanops cingulatus =

Species of sea snail

Lusitanops cingulatus is a species of sea snail, a marine gastropod mollusc in the family Raphitomidae.

== Description ==
The length of the shell varies between 5 millimetres (0.20 in) and 6 millimetres (0.24 in).

== Distribution ==
This species occurs in the North Atlantic Ocean.
