= Lusitanops sigmoideus =

Scientific classification
- Kingdom: Animalia
- Phylum: Mollusca
- Class: Gastropoda
- Subclass: Caenogastropoda
- Order: Neogastropoda
- Superfamily: Conoidea
- Family: Raphitomidae
- Genus: Lusitanops
- Species: L. sigmoideus

Binomial name
- Lusitanops sigmoideus Bouchet & Warén, 1980

Species of sea snail

Lusitanops sigmoideus is a species of sea snail, a marine gastropod mollusk in the family Raphitomidae.

== Distribution ==
This species occurs in the Northern Atlantic Ocean.
