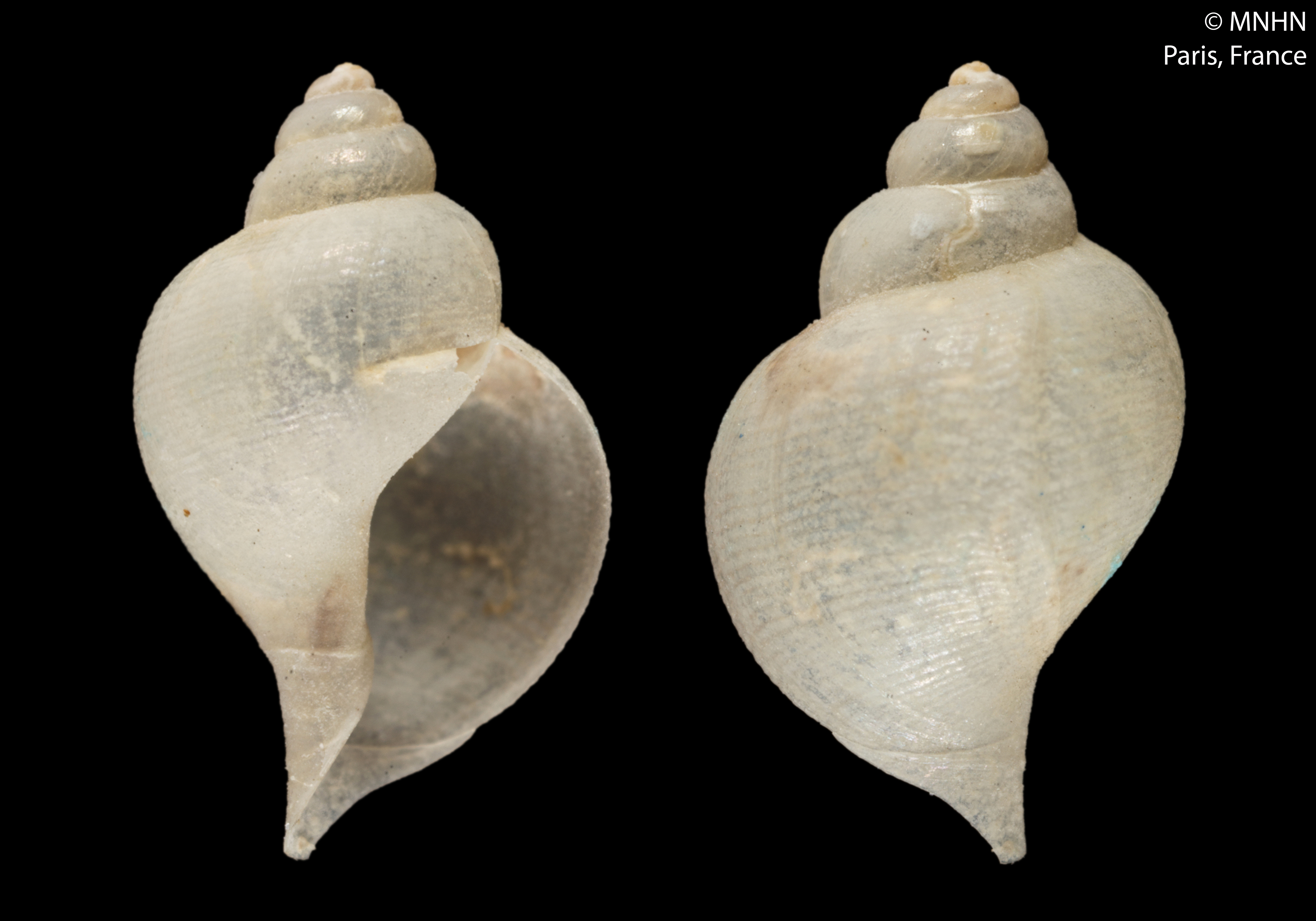
- Shell of Lusitanops macrapex (holotype at MNHN, Paris)

Scientific classification
- Kingdom: Animalia
- Phylum: Mollusca
- Class: Gastropoda
- Subclass: Caenogastropoda
- Order: Neogastropoda
- Superfamily: Conoidea
- Family: Raphitomidae
- Genus: Lusitanops
- Species: L. macrapex

Binomial name
- Lusitanops macrapex Bouchet & Warén, 1980

= Lusitanops macrapex =

Species of sea snail

Lusitanops macrapex is a species of sea snail, a marine gastropod mollusc in the family Raphitomidae.

== Distribution ==
This species occurs in the North Atlantic Ocean.
