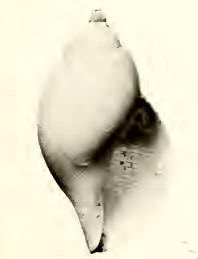
- Original image of a shell of Lusitanops blanchardi

Scientific classification
- Kingdom: Animalia
- Phylum: Mollusca
- Class: Gastropoda
- Subclass: Caenogastropoda
- Order: Neogastropoda
- Superfamily: Conoidea
- Family: Raphitomidae
- Genus: Lusitanops
- Species: L. blanchardi

Binomial name
- Lusitanops blanchardi (Dautzenberg & Fischer, 1896)

Synonyms
- Pleurotoma blanchardi Dautzenberg & Fischer, 1896

= Lusitanops blanchardi =

Species of sea snail

Lusitanops blanchardi is a species of sea snail, a marine gastropod mollusk in the family Raphitomidae.

== Description ==
The length of the shell attains 6.7 mm, its diameter 3.7 mm.

Thin shell has an ovoid shape. The spire is of mediocre length, occupying hardly more than a third of the total height. The shell is composed of 6 convex whorls, separated by a well-marked suture. The three whorls of the protoconch are finely reticulated. The subsequent whorls are crossed by many regular decurrent cords, flattened, about the same width as their intervals and by filiform longitudinal folds irregularly spaced. The body whorl is large and inflated, occupying 4/5 of the total height. The aperture is wide and, elongatedly oval. The columella undulates slightly, attenuated at the base and shows a narrow callus, thin, applied, barely visible. The outer lip is simple, sharp, arcuate, not indented and provided only at the apex with a very wide and shallow sinus. The color of the shell is opaque white. The color of the whorls of the protoconch is clear fawn.

== Distribution ==
This marine species occurs off the Azores at depths between 1100 m and 1300 m.
