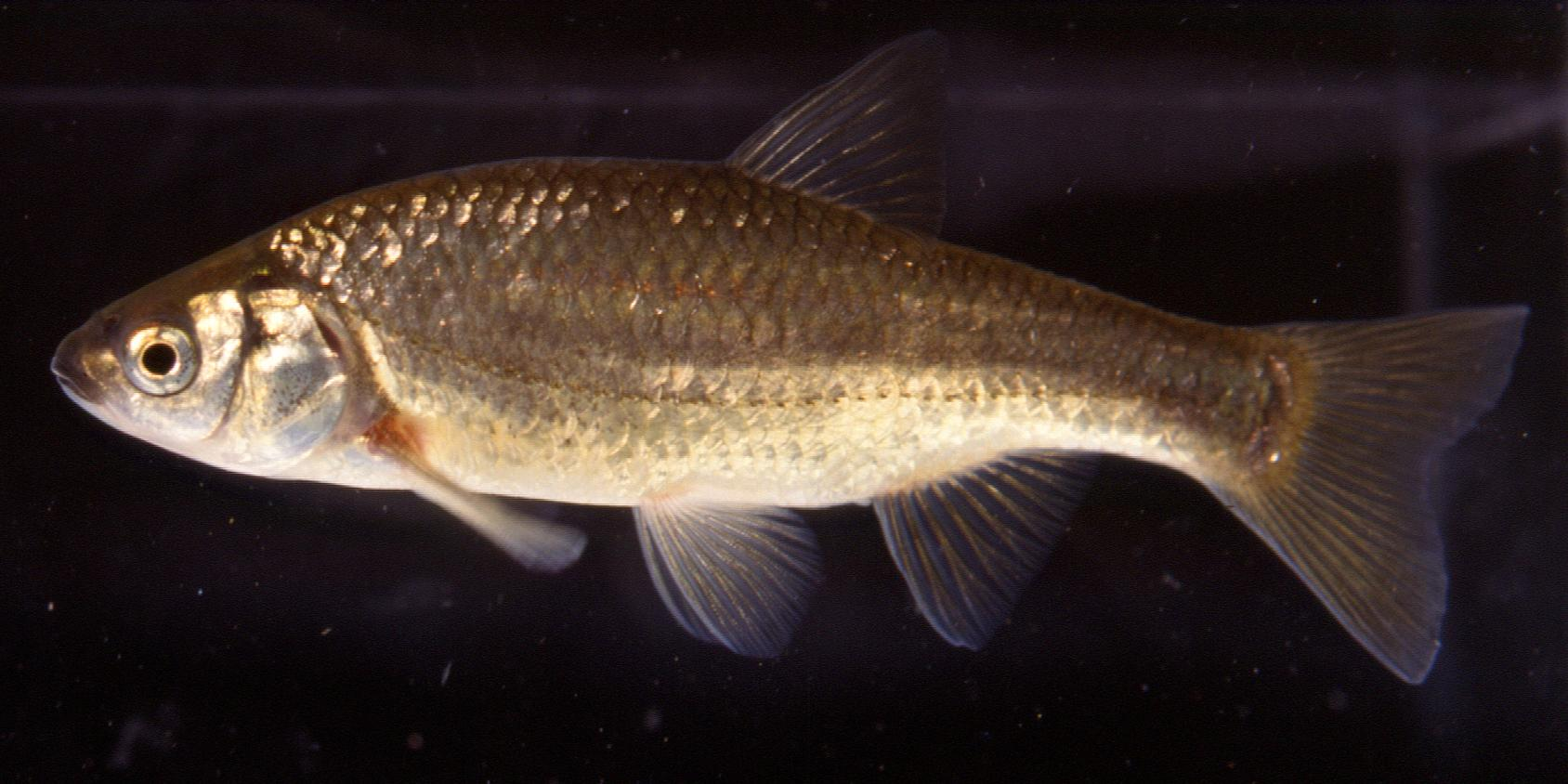

Conservation status
- Endangered (IUCN 3.1)

Scientific classification
- Kingdom: Animalia
- Phylum: Chordata
- Class: Actinopterygii
- Order: Cypriniformes
- Family: Leuciscidae
- Subfamily: Leuciscinae
- Genus: Iberochondrostoma
- Species: I. olisiponense

Binomial name
- Iberochondrostoma olisiponense (Gante, C. D. Santos & Alves, 2007)

Synonyms
- Chondrostoma olisiponensis Gante, Santos & Alves, 2007; Iberochondrostoma olisiponensis (Gante, Santos & Alves, 2007)

= Iberochondrostoma olisiponense =

Species of fish

Iberochondrostoma olisiponense, the Lisbon arched-mouth nase, is a species of freshwater ray-finned fish belonging to the family Leuciscidae. This species was discovered in 2007 in the lower Rio Tejo basin, Portugal.

== Identification ==
The Lisbon arched-mouth nase is a small cyprinid. Adults range from 5 to 11 cm (2.0 to 4.3 in), though there are records of specimens reaching ca. 18 cm (7.1 in). It can be distinguished from the other Iberian nase species by the lack of horny blade on the lower jaw, the absence of intense reddish coloration at the base of the fins and by its pronouncedly arched mouth. It has elongated pelvic fins that reach the anus and often pass the anal-fin insertion in males, and dorsal, pelvic and anal fins usually have 8 branched rays. This species has 36 to 43 scales in the lateral line, 7.0 to 8.5 scales above the lateral line, 13 to 16 circumpeduncular scales, denticulated (vs. smooth) grinding teeth surfaces, 6-5/5 pharyngeal teeth and 15 to 19 gill rakers. It is further distinguished from Iberochondrostoma lusitanicum, a phylogenetically close species that lives in the same area, by having a higher body, a relatively longer head, and a larger eye. The origins of anal and pelvic fins are displaced anteriorly, while the origin of pectoral fins is displaced posteriorly. Pelvic and pectoral fins and last anal-fin ray are longer in the new species. Unlike the other phylogenetically related species, the Lisbon's arched-mouth nase shows external sexual dimorphism, with males having longer pelvic fins whose extremities pass the anus and often overlap with the anal fin.

== Origin ==
It was estimated from a molecular clock that the species had split 7.9-12.5 million years ago (middle–upper Miocene) from its most recent ancestor. This period coincides with a phase of endorheism in the Iberian Peninsula.

== Distribution ==
This species is endemic to the lower Rio Tejo basin. It was only found in three tributaries of the Tejo River, namely, Trancão, Maior, and Muge.

== Conservation ==
The Lisbon's arched-mouth nase was found to be locally rare. Additionally, its distribution is limited to an area of high human impact on water resources, through water extraction for agriculture, introduction of exotic species, water pollution and land reclamation, which pose serious risks to its survival.

The species has been placed in the category Endangered B1ab(iii)+2ab(iii) according to IUCN criteria.
