= Lizandro River =

River in Lisbon, Portugal

Lizandro
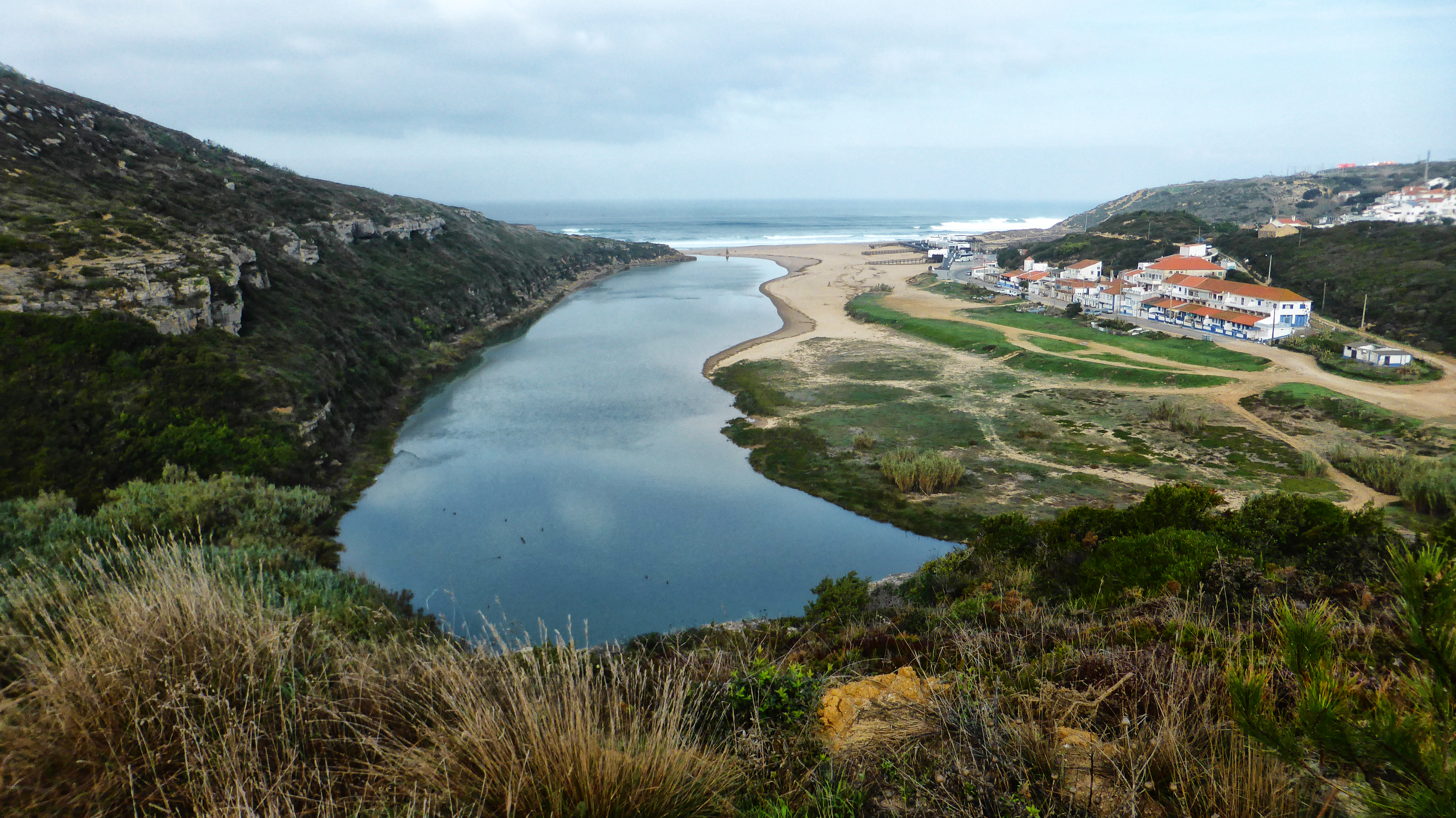
- Beach at the mouth of the Lizandro river

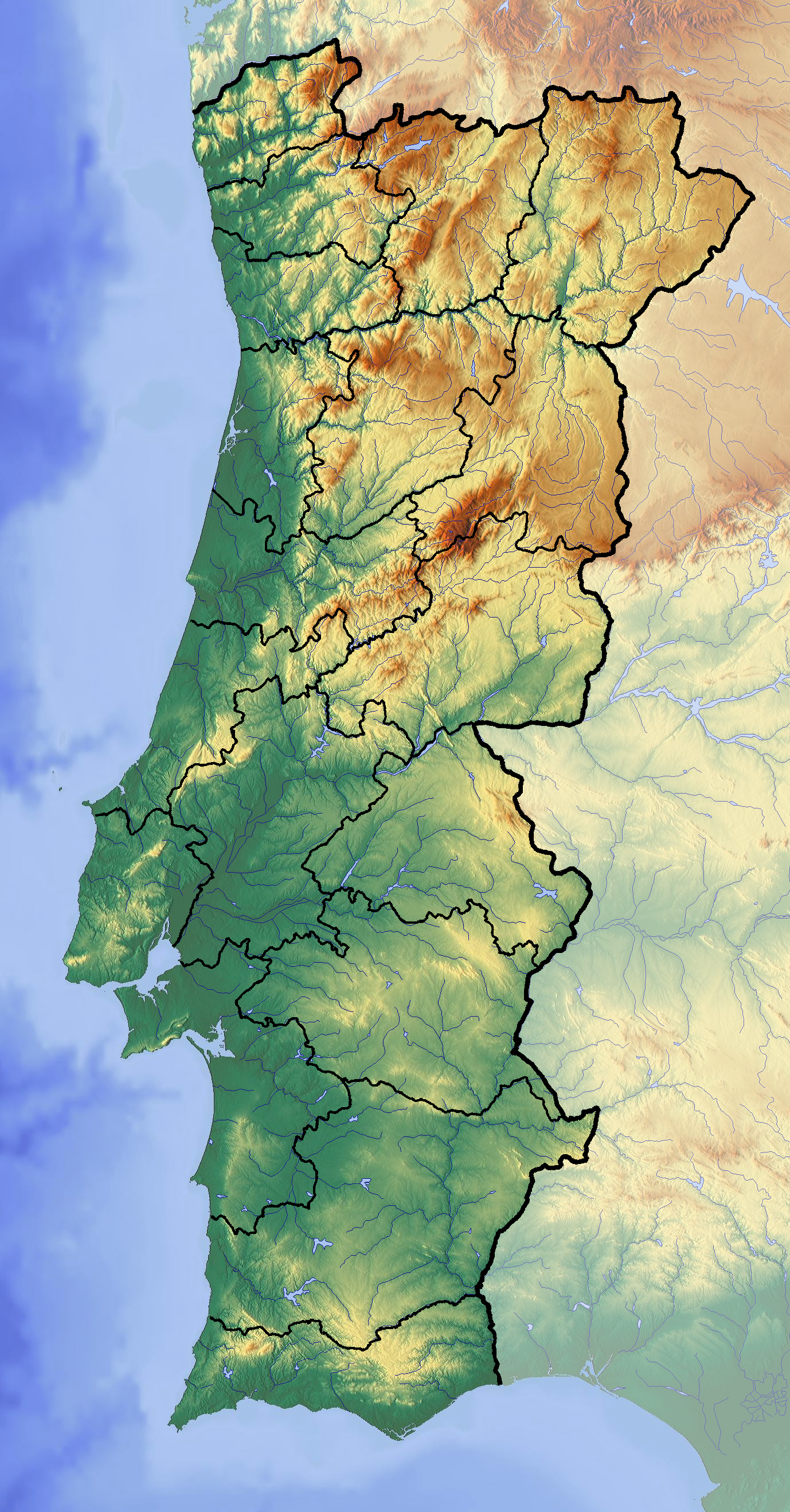
- Lizandro within Portugal

Physical characteristics
- Source
  - location: near Almargem do Bispo, Sintra
  - coordinates: 38.9004044°N 9.2895519°W
  - elevation: 300 m (980 ft)
- Mouth: Beach of the Mouth of the Lizandro (Praia da Foz do Lizandro)
  - location: west of Carvoeira, Mafra
  - coordinates: 38.941674°N 9.415708°W
  - elevation: 0 m (0 ft)

Basin features
- River system: Lizandro Basin
- Tributaries
  - left: Ribeira da Cabrela
  - right: Ribeira dos Tostões, Ribeira do Lexim, Ribeira da Mata, Regueiro da Serra, Rio Pequeno, Ribeira da Vidigueira

The Lizandro (Portuguese pronunciation: [liˈzɐ̃dɾu]) also known as Ribeira do Mourão, Ribeira de Anços, Ribeira dos Tostões, Ribeira de Cheleiros, is a river in the district of Lisbon, Portugal. The exact location of its source is unknown, due to a lack of studies. Its mouth is located in Carvoeira, Mafra, Portugal, on a beach named Foz do Lizandro, which has a Blue Flag beach certification. The river's basin has three protected areas: two limestone pavements (Campo de lapiás da Granja de Serrões and Campo de lapiás de Negrais) and the boulder of Lexim. The Cheleiros' valley, through which Lizandro passes through, has been immortalized in Memorial do Convento by José Saramago (the Convent mentioned in the title is the Convento de Mafra).

== River modifications ==
The Fort of Zambujal (of the Lines of Torres Vedras) was constructed during the Napoleonic Wars near the Lizandro's mouth, to provide support to the British fleet.

The following bridges cross over the Lizandro river:

- The Nossa Senhora do Ó bridge, of Roman construction.
- The old bridge of Cheleiras, of Roman or medieval construction.
- A bridge that is part of the National route EN247.

About 1.5 km from the coast, a sewage treatment facility was inaugurated in 2015. The facility was built with four tanks, but, as of 2017, it only uses a maximum of two (during Summer). The number was determined based on an expectation of significant population growth in Mafra and Ericeira. Practically all (99%) of the material removed from the water is turned into fertilizer and the remaining is combusted.

In 2018, an Ecological Park was built in Venda do Pinheiro, including a playground, a transport hub, a library, and an interpretation centre dedicated to the Lizandro River.

== Natural history ==
The following species of fish have been documented on the Lizandro river:

- Chondrostoma lusitanicum
- Leuciscus pyrenaicus
- Luciobarbus bocagei
- Cobitis marrocana
- Liza ramada
- Carassius auratus
- Cyprinus carpio
- Lepomis gibbosus

In 1993, fish (namely, hundreds of mullets) were found dead on the shore. An industrial origin seemed unlikely as the river has no nearby factories, but domestic sewage is discharged into the river.

In 2018, the beach Foz do Lizandro was temporarily interdicted due to elevated concentration of escherichia coli.

== Economy and recreation ==
The river's beach has been the stage (along with Ericeira) of "Surf Summits", a Web Summit pre-conference.

There is an annual raft competition (there have been four as of 2019) in the river, where people go down the river in their own rafts.

== Gallery ==
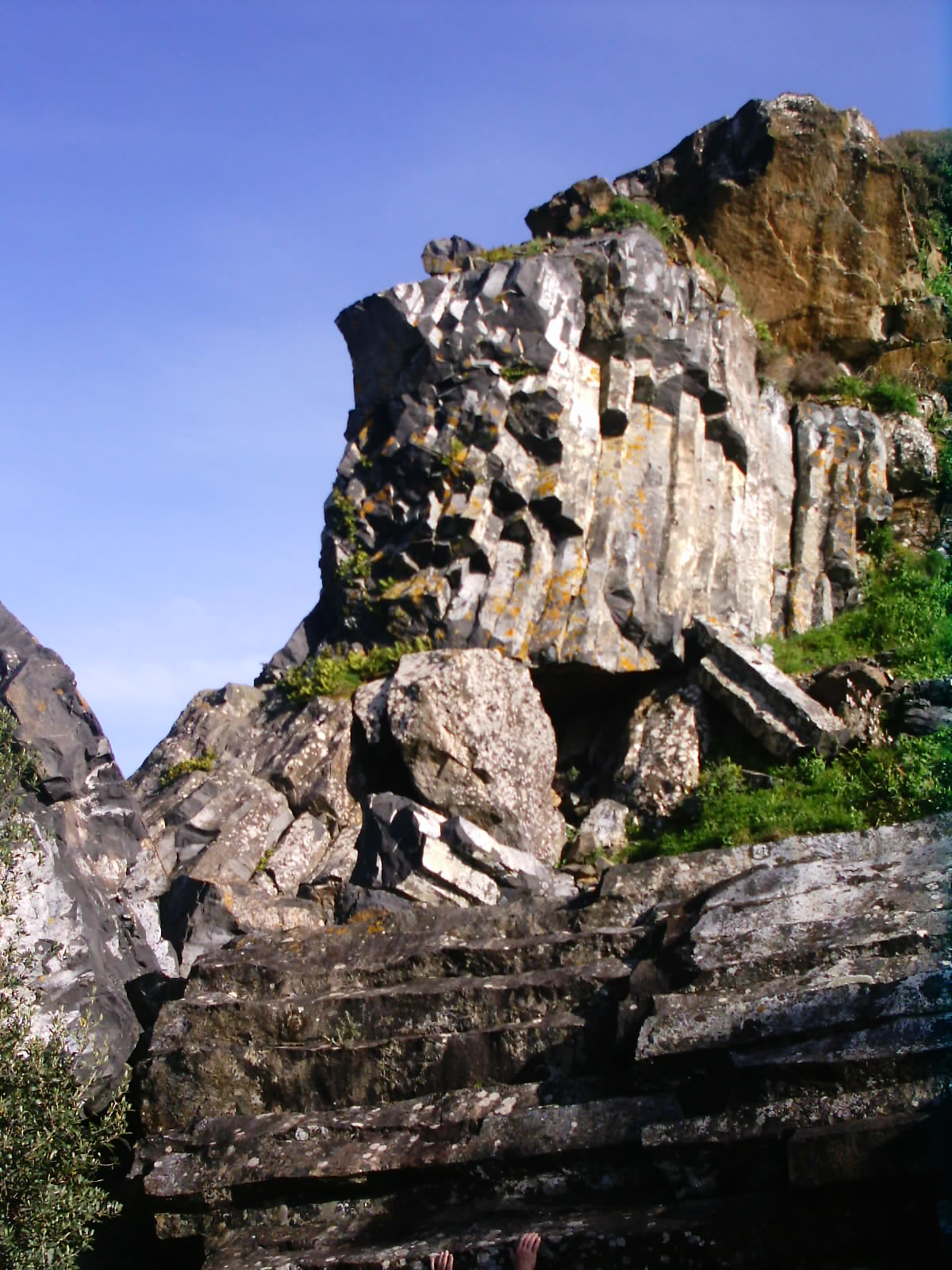
Penedo de Lexim

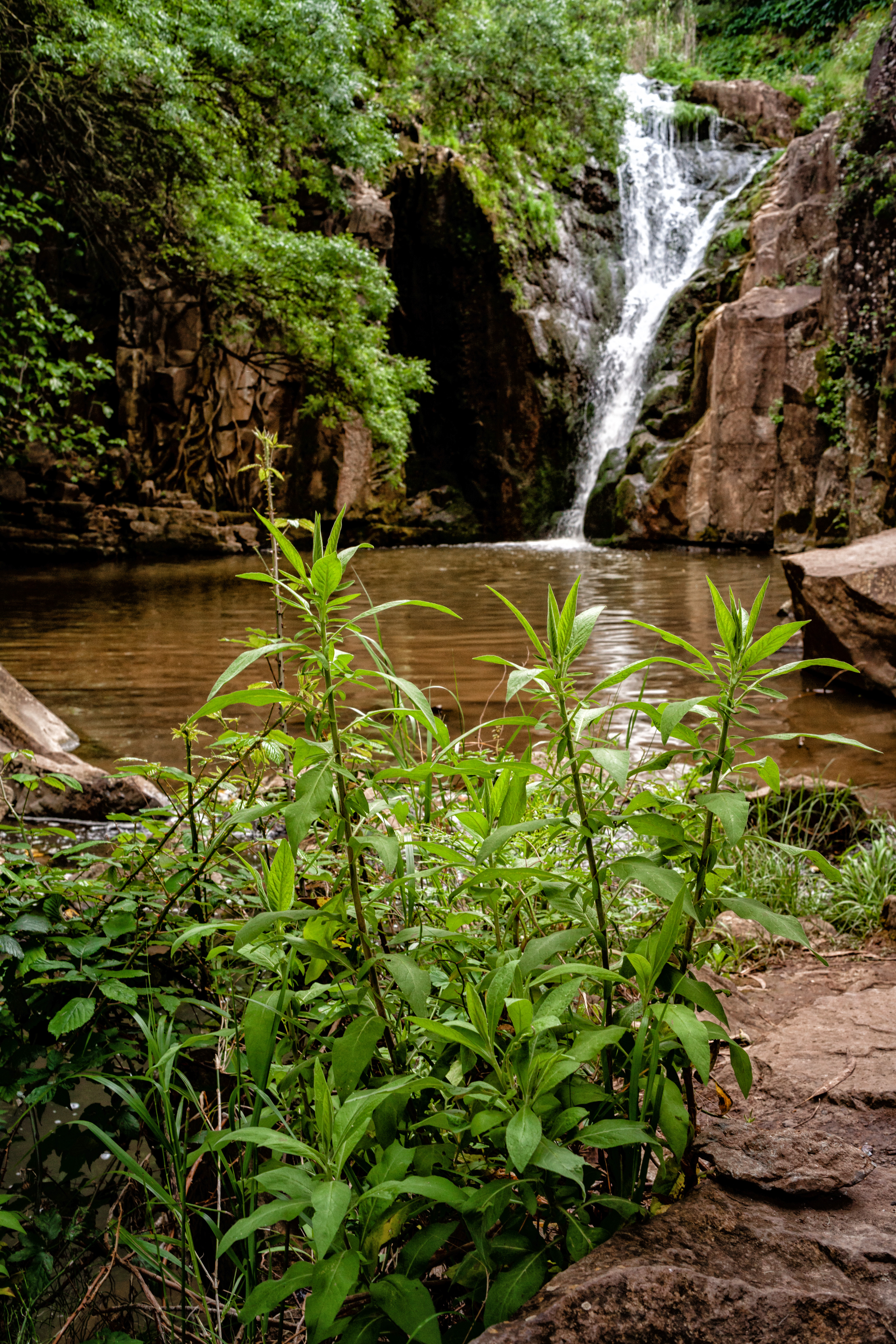
Cascata de Anços

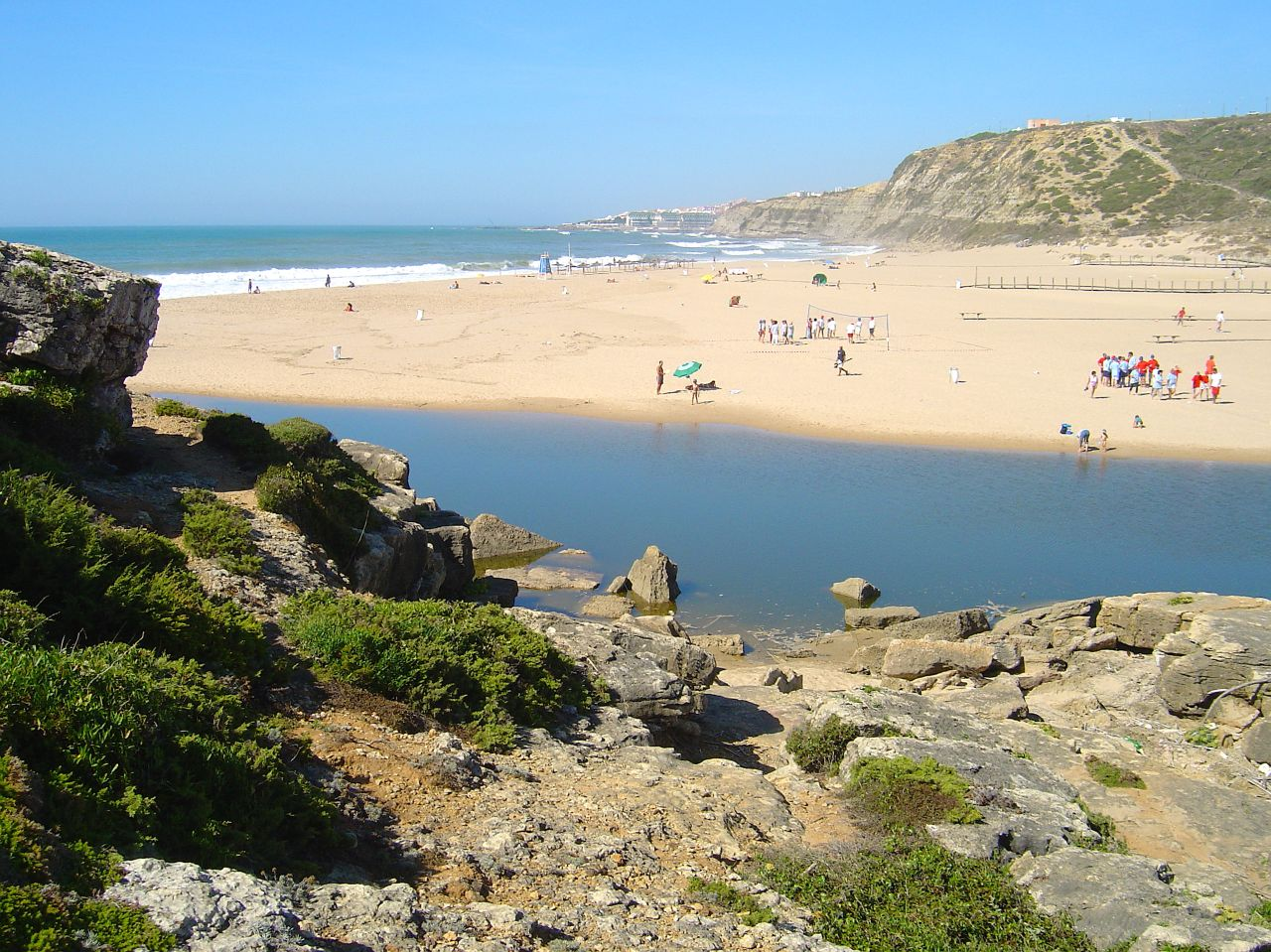
Beach at the Mouth of Lizandro

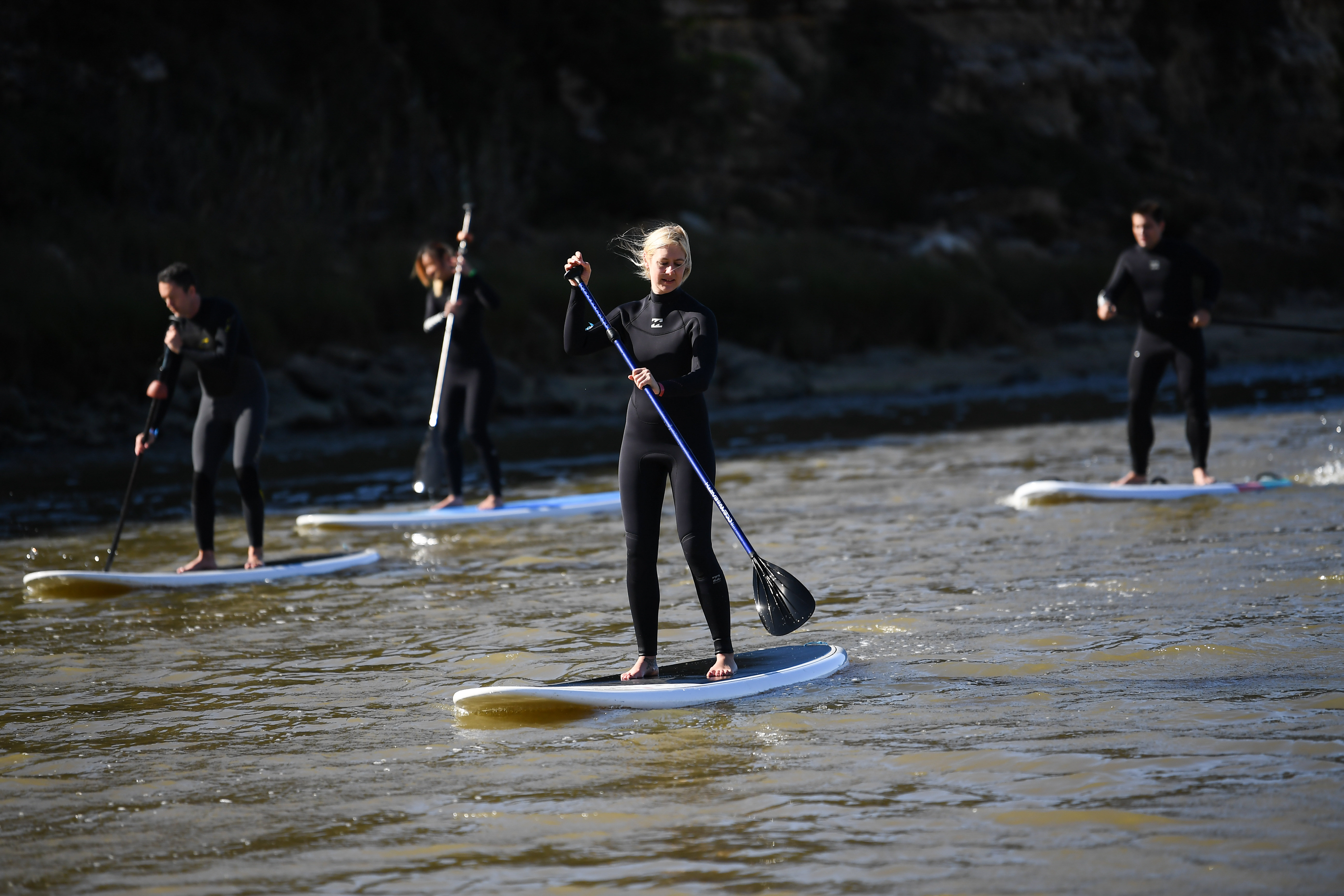
Surf Summit participants doing standup paddleboarding.

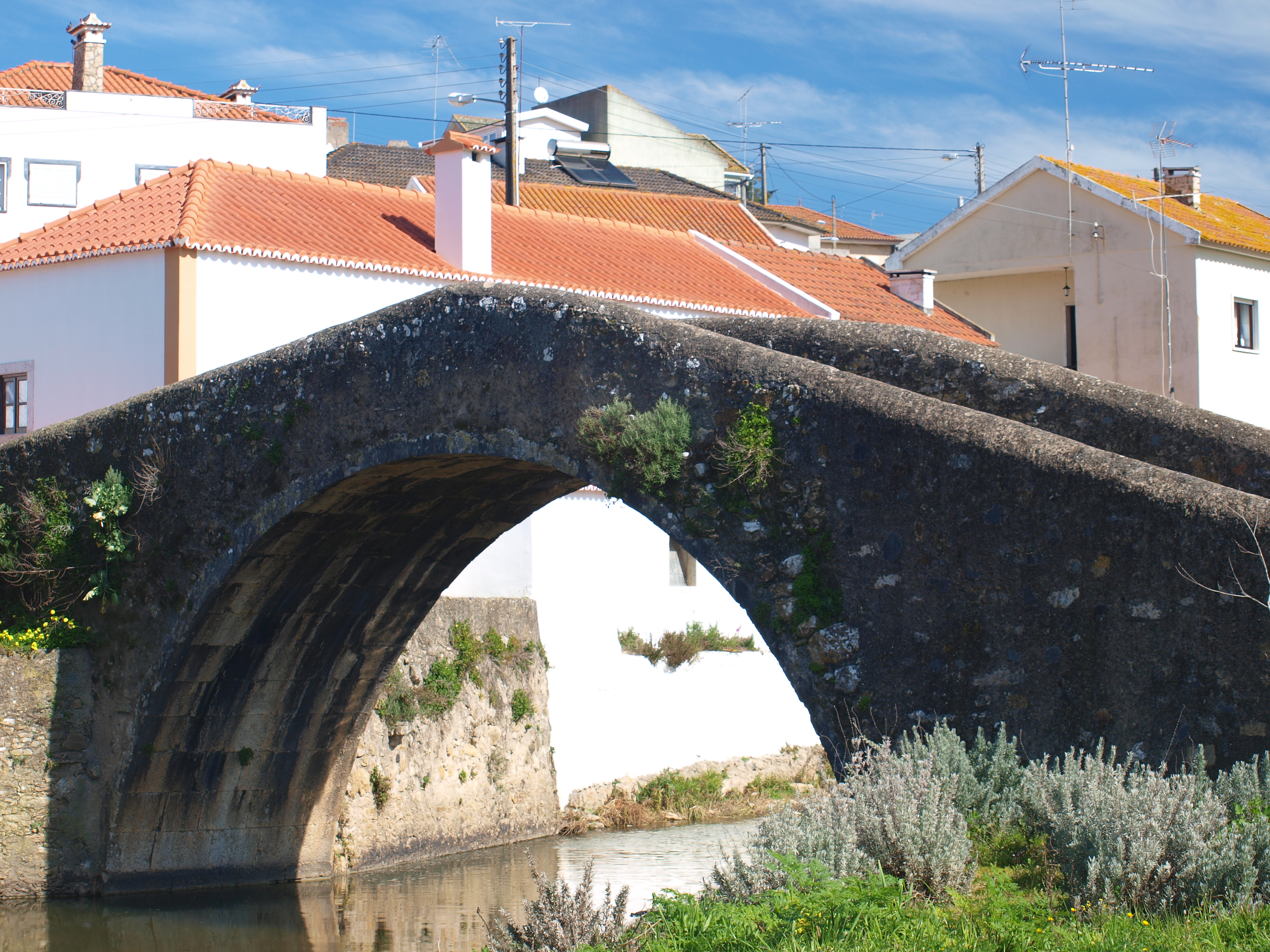
Cheleiros' old bridge
