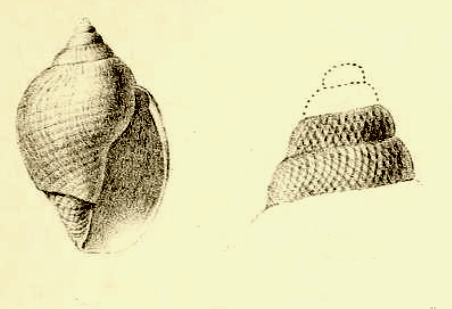
- Original image of a shell and protoconch of Lusitanops bullioides

Scientific classification
- Kingdom: Animalia
- Phylum: Mollusca
- Class: Gastropoda
- Subclass: Caenogastropoda
- Order: Neogastropoda
- Superfamily: Conoidea
- Family: Raphitomidae
- Genus: Lusitanops
- Species: L. bullioides

Binomial name
- Lusitanops bullioides (Sykes, 1906)

Synonyms
- Pleurotomella bullioides Sykes, 1906

= Lusitanops bullioides =

Species of sea snail

Lusitanops bullioides is a species of sea snail, a marine gastropod mollusk in the family Raphitomidae.

== Description ==
The length of the shell attains 4 mm, its diameter 2.8 mm.

(Original description) The shell has an ovate fusiform shape with the spire rather depressed. Its colour is white, with a chestnut-brown protoconch. The shell contains six somewhat convex whorls with a suture well-marked. The protoconch is composed of four whorls, the first minutely punctate, the second and third being decussated by arcuate riblets, while the fourth whorl has this decussation on its lower half, but one series of riblets has become obsolete on the upper half. The residue of the shell is, in some specimens, marked by three or four incised lines, the only other sculpture being the lines of growth, which are sinuous and more noticeable just below the suture. The body whorl is large and inflated. The aperture is ovate. The columella is slightly curved. The outer lip is thin and arcuate, with a deep sinus at its upper margin.

== Distribution ==
This marine species occurs off Portugal.
