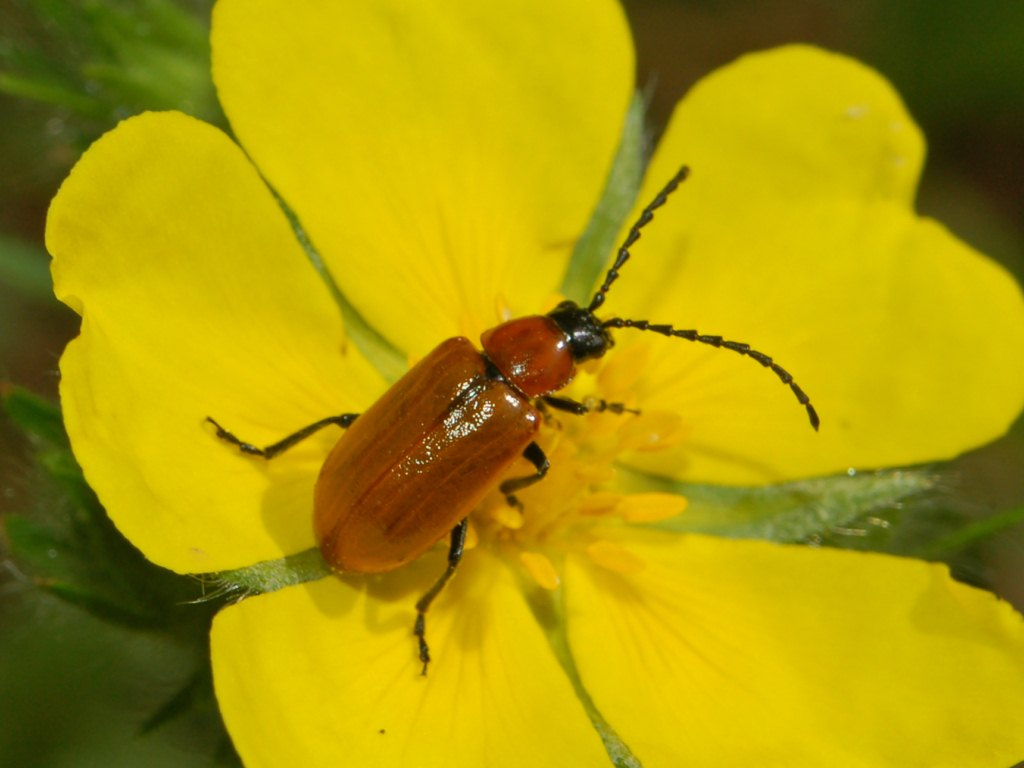
- Exosoma lusitanicum

Scientific classification
- Kingdom: Animalia
- Phylum: Arthropoda
- Clade: Pancrustacea
- Class: Insecta
- Order: Coleoptera
- Suborder: Polyphaga
- Infraorder: Cucujiformia
- Family: Chrysomelidae
- Subtribe: Luperina
- Genus: Exosoma; Jacoby, 1903

Synonyms
- Malacosoma Chevrolat in Dejean, 1836 (preocc.); Malacoptera Hope, 1840; Malacodora Bedel, 1905

= Exosoma =

Genus of beetles

Exosoma is a genus of skeletonizing leaf beetles belonging to the family Chrysomelidae, subfamily Galerucinae.

== Species ==
Species within this genus include:

- Exosoma abyssiniacum Weise, 1907
- Exosoma albanicum (Meschnigg, 1934)
- Exosoma albanicum Meschnigg, 1934
- Exosoma alluaudi Laboissiere, 1919
- Exosoma alternatum Laboissiere, 1931
- Exosoma angolense Laboissiere, 1939
- Exosoma apicale Laboissiere, 1919
- Exosoma apicipenne (Jacoby, 1899)
- Exosoma barkeri Jacoby, 1903
- Exosoma basimarginatum (Jacoby, 1895)
- Exosoma bayoni (Laboissiere, 1937)
- Exosoma bicolor (Allard, 1889)
- Exosoma capitatum (Jacoby, 1897)
- Exosoma clypeatum (Jacoby, 1895)
- Exosoma collare (Hummel, 1825)
- Exosoma collare Hummel, 1825
- Exosoma congoanum (Weise, 1915)
- Exosoma convexiusculum Bechyne, 1954
- Exosoma costatum Kimoto, 1996
- Exosoma dalmani (Jacoby, 1897)
- Exosoma dilatatum (Jacoby, 1894)
- Exosoma discoidale (Jacoby, 1895)
- Exosoma donckieri (Jacoby, 1897)
- Exosoma fairmairei (Jacoby, 1895)
- Exosoma femorale Laboissiere, 1937
- Exosoma flavicorne (Jacoby, 1892)
- Exosoma fulvonigrum Laboissiere, 1938
- Exosoma gaudioni (Reiche, 1862)
- Exosoma gaudionis Reiche, 1862
- Exosoma geniculatum Laboissiere, 1910
- Exosoma gerstaeckeri (Jacoby, 1899)
- Exosoma ghesquierei Laboissiere, 1940
- Exosoma gracilicorne (Weise, 1895)
- Exosoma illota (Boheman, 1895)
- Exosoma indecorum (Weise, 1927)
- Exosoma insulare Laboissiere, 1937
- Exosoma keniense Laboissiere, 1919
- Exosoma kibonotense Weise, 1909
- Exosoma kohlschutteri (Weise, 1903)
- Exosoma lebrunae Laboissiere, 1940
- Exosoma lundana Laboissiere, 1939
- Exosoma lusitanicum (Linnaeus, 1767)
- Exosoma luteum Laboissiere, 1932
- Exosoma maculicolle Weise, 1907
- Exosoma marginellum Bechyne, 1954
- Exosoma melanocephalum (Jacoby, 1899)
- Exosoma meroudi Laboissiere, 1939
- Exosoma meruense Weise, 1909
- Exosoma monticola Weise, 1909
- Exosoma neglecta Mohr, 1968
- Exosoma nigricolle (Jacoby, 1892)
- Exosoma nigricorne (Weise, 1902)
- Exosoma nigritulum (Chapuis, 1879)
- Exosoma nigriventre (Quedenfeldt, 1888)
- Exosoma nigrocephalum Laboissiere, 1939
- Exosoma nigrofulvum Laboissiere, 1939
- Exosoma nigrum (Allard, 1889)
- Exosoma nodieri Laboissiere, 1923
- Exosoma opaculum (Fairmaire, 1902)
- Exosoma ornatum Laboissiere, 1940
- Exosoma pallidum (Jacoby, 1897)
- Exosoma pallidum Laboissiere, 1931
- Exosoma parvulum (Jacoby, 1884)
- Exosoma pectorale Weise, 1914
- Exosoma persimplex Weise, 1909
- Exosoma pseudoakkoae Medvedev, 1998
- Exosoma pubescens (Weise, 1927)
- Exosoma quadimaculatum (Jacoby, 1882)
- Exosoma rudepunctatum (Allard, 1889)
- Exosoma seabrai Laboissiere, 1939
- Exosoma sheppardi Jacoby, 1906
- Exosoma speciosum Weise, 1907
- Exosoma straminipenne (Weise, 1907)
- Exosoma sturmi Jacoby, 1906
- Exosoma suturale (Jacoby, 1895)
- Exosoma testaceum (Olivier, 1791)
- Exosoma theryi (Guillebeau, 1897)
- Exosoma thoracicum (Redtenbacher, 1843)
- Exosoma tibiale (Jacoby, 1898)
- Exosoma tibiellum Bechyne, 1954
- Exosoma tomokunii Takizawa, 1990
- Exosoma tomokunii Takizawa, 1990
- Exosoma tongaatense Jacoby, 1906
- Exosoma transvaalense (Jacoby, 1898)
- Exosoma unicolor (Jacoby, 1894)
- Exosoma unipunctatum (Harold, 1880)
- Exosoma variipe (Jacoby, 1900)
- Exosoma ventrale (Weise, 1902)
- Exosoma viridipenne (Chapuis, 1880)
- Exosoma vittatum Laboissiere, 1939
- Exosoma wittei Laboissiere, 1940
