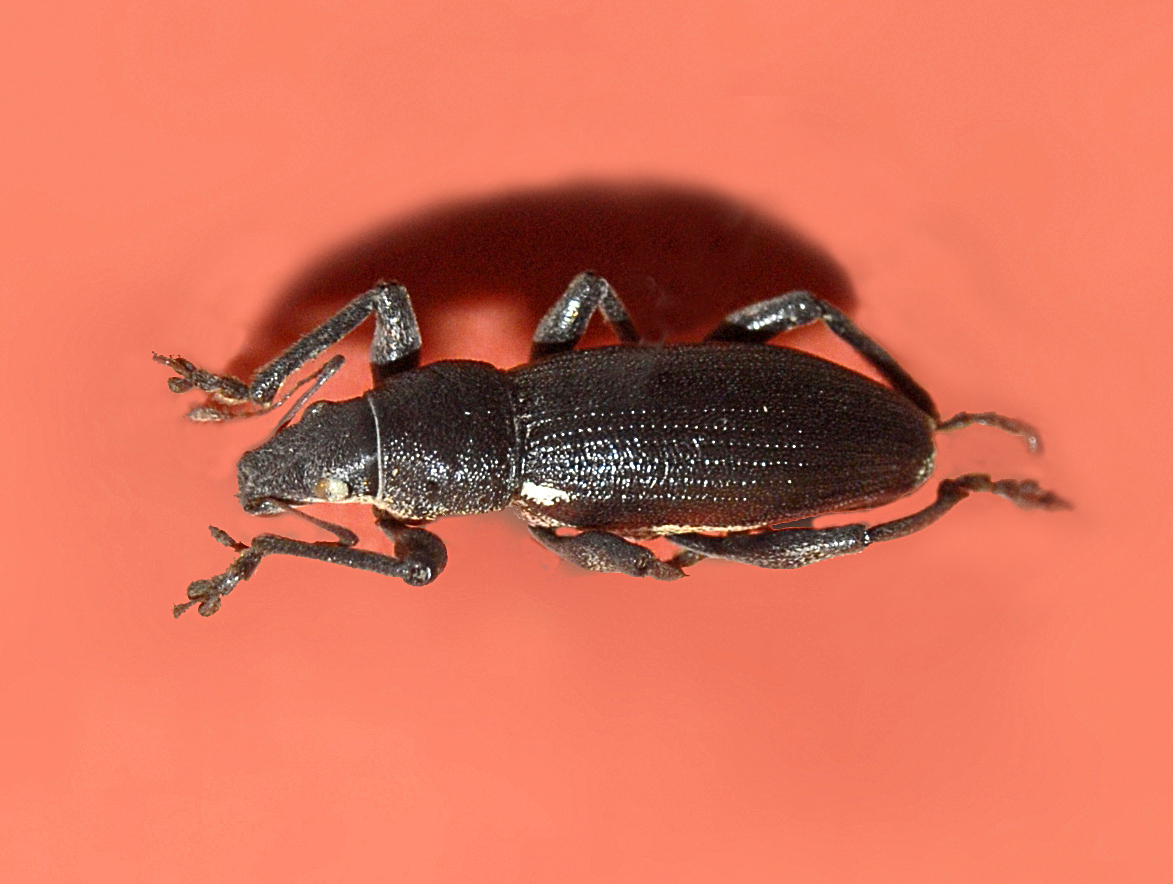
- Museum specimen of Brachyderes lusitanicus

Scientific classification
- Kingdom: Animalia
- Phylum: Arthropoda
- Clade: Pancrustacea
- Class: Insecta
- Order: Coleoptera
- Suborder: Polyphaga
- Infraorder: Cucujiformia
- Superfamily: Curculionoidea
- Family: Curculionidae
- Tribe: Brachyderini
- Genus: Brachyderes; Schönherr, 1826

= Brachyderes =

Genus of beetles

Brachyderes is a genus in the weevil family (Curculionidae).

== Selected species ==
- Brachyderes confusus Viedma, 1967
- Brachyderes grisescens Fairmaire, 1862
- Brachyderes incanus (Linnaeus, 1758)
- Brachyderes lineolatus Fairmaire, 1862
- Brachyderes lusitanicus (Fabricius, 1781)
- Brachyderes marginellus Graells, 1858
- Brachyderes pubescens Boheman, 1833
- Brachyderes rugatus Wollaston, 1864
- Brachyderes suturalis Graells, 1851
