= Carabus lusitanicus breuningi =

Scientific classification
- Kingdom: Animalia
- Phylum: Arthropoda
- Class: Insecta
- Order: Coleoptera
- Suborder: Adephaga
- Family: Carabidae
- Genus: Carabus
- Species: C. lusitanicus
- Subspecies: C. l. breuningi

Trinomial name
- Carabus lusitanicus breuningi Csiki, 1927

Synonyms
- Carabus kricheldorffi Breuning, 1926, nec Le Moult, 1913

Subspecies of beetle

Carabus lusitanicus breuningi is a subspecies of beetle in the family Carabidae that is endemic to Spain. They are black coloured.
