= Iberochondrostoma oretanum =

Conservation status
- Endangered (IUCN 3.1)

Scientific classification
- Kingdom: Animalia
- Phylum: Chordata
- Class: Actinopterygii
- Order: Cypriniformes
- Family: Leuciscidae
- Subfamily: Leuciscinae
- Genus: Iberochondrostoma
- Species: I. oretanum

Binomial name
- Iberochondrostoma oretanum (Doadrio & Carmona, 2003)

Synonyms
- Chondrostoma oretanum Doadrio & Carmona, 2003

Species of fish

Iberochondrostoma oretanum is a species of freshwater ray-finned fish belonging to the family Leuciscidae. This species is endemic to Spain where it is found in the Robledillo and Fresnada rivers, tributaries of the Jándula (es) in the Guadalquivir system.

Its natural habitat is intermittent rivers. It is threatened by habitat loss.
