= Lusitanops hyaloides =

Scientific classification
- Kingdom: Animalia
- Phylum: Mollusca
- Class: Gastropoda
- Subclass: Caenogastropoda
- Order: Neogastropoda
- Superfamily: Conoidea
- Family: Raphitomidae
- Genus: Lusitanops
- Species: L. hyaloides

Binomial name
- Lusitanops hyaloides (Dautzenberg, 1925)

Synonyms
- Pleurotoma hyaloides Dautzenberg, 1925

Species of sea snail

Lusitanops hyaloides is a species of sea snail, a marine gastropod mollusk in the family Raphitomidae.

== Description ==
The length of the shell attains 17 mm.

The shell of this species is pyramidal in shape, and rounded, with a pronounced siphonal mouth.

== Distribution ==
This species is found in the Western Mediterranean. and off the Azores.
