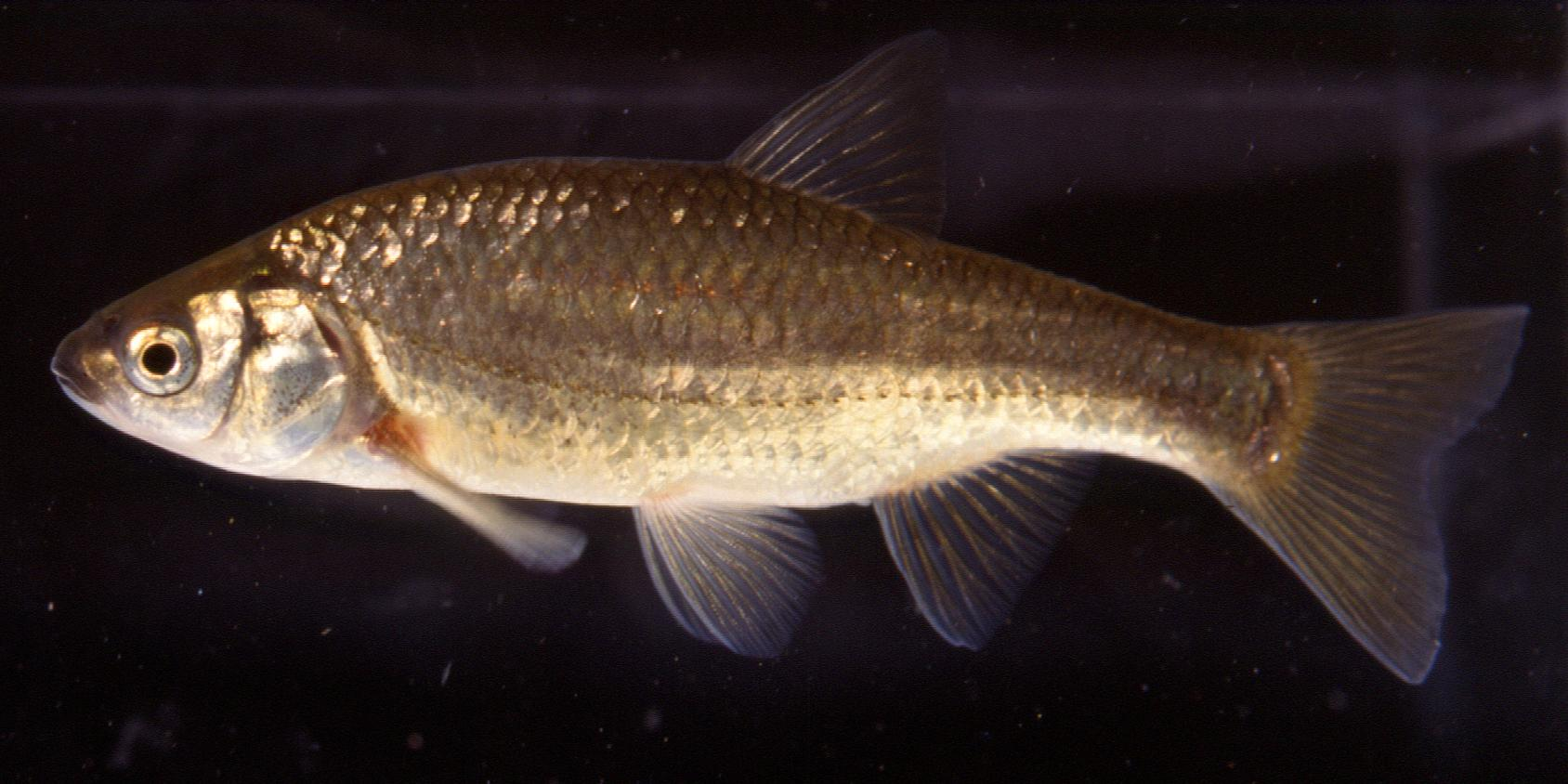
- Iberochondrostoma olisponensis

Scientific classification
- Kingdom: Animalia
- Phylum: Chordata
- Class: Actinopterygii
- Order: Cypriniformes
- Family: Leuciscidae
- Subfamily: Leuciscinae
- Genus: Iberochondrostoma; Robalo, V. C. Almada, Levy & Doadrio, 2007

Type species
- Leuciscus lemmingii Steindachner, 1866

= Iberochondrostoma =

Genus of fishes

Iberochondrostoma is a genus of freshwater ray-finned fishes belonging to the family Leuciscidae. The fishes in this genus are endemic to the Iberian Peninsula.

== Species ==
Iberochondrostoma contains the following species:

- Iberochondrostoma almacai (M. M. Coelho, Mesquita & Collares-Pereira, 2005)
- Iberochondrostoma lemmingii (Steindachner, 1866)
- Iberochondrostoma lusitanicum (Collares-Pereira, 1980) (Boga-portugesa)
- Iberochondrostoma olisiponensis (Gante, C. D. Santos & Alves, 2007) (Lisbon arched-mouth nase)
- Iberochondrostoma oretanum (Doadrio & Carmona, 2003)
