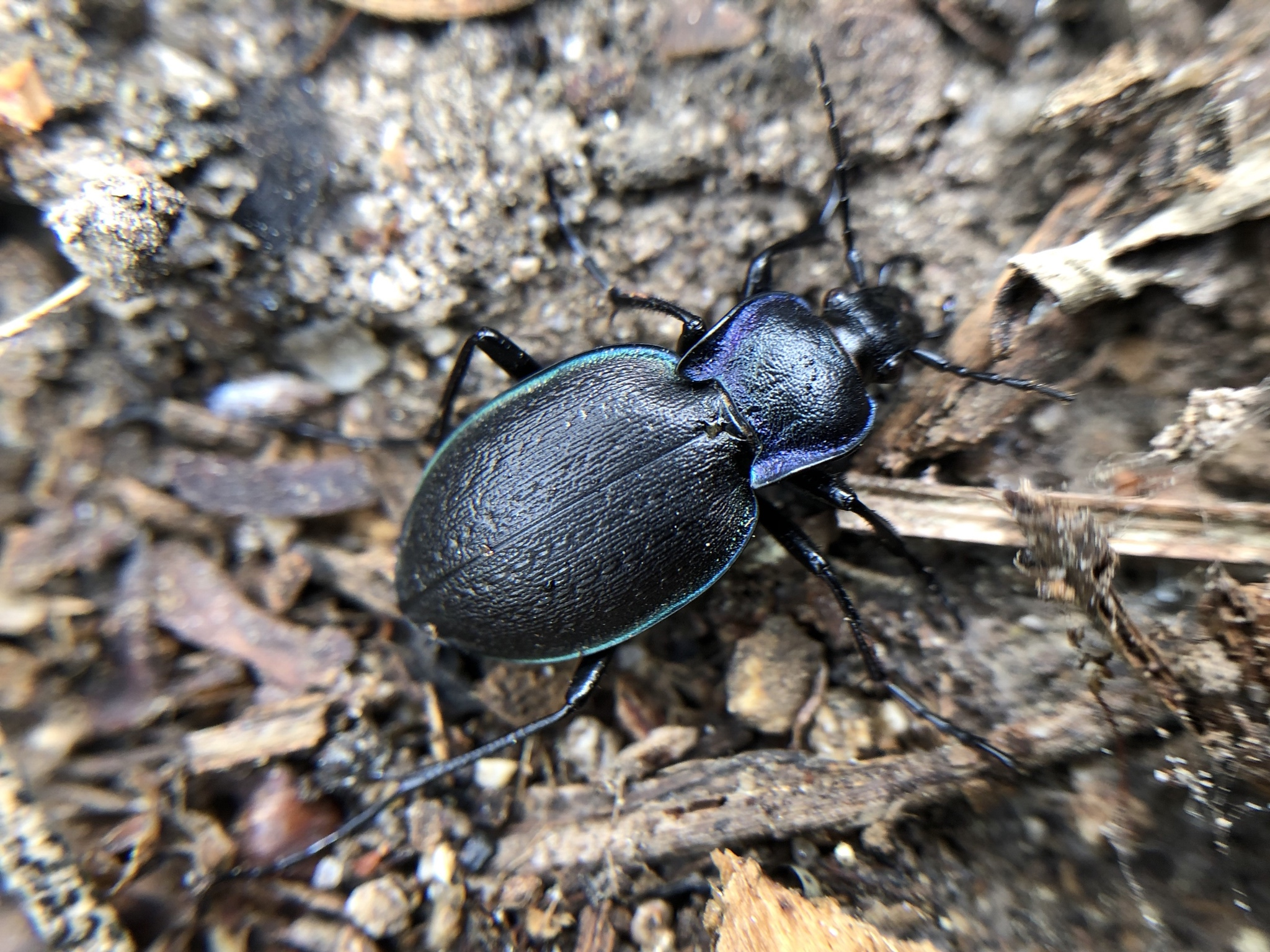

Scientific classification
- Kingdom: Animalia
- Phylum: Arthropoda
- Class: Insecta
- Order: Coleoptera
- Suborder: Adephaga
- Family: Carabidae
- Genus: Carabus
- Species: C. lusitanicus
- Subspecies: C. l. brevis

Trinomial name
- Carabus lusitanicus brevis Dejean, 1826

Synonyms
- Carabus complanatus Dejean, 1826; Carabus albarracinus Ganglbauer, 1886; Carabus aragonicus Ganglbauer, 1886; Carabus complantus Morawitz, 1890; Carabus logronicus Breuning, 1926; Carabus sorianus (Jeanne, 1972); Carabus guardoensis Meyer & Mollard; Carabus guardoensis Meyer & Mollard in Deuve, 2003

= Carabus lusitanicus brevis =

Subspecies of beetle

Carabus lusitanicus brevis is a subspecies of beetle in the family Carabidae that is endemic to Spain. Males are yellowish-green coloured, while females are blackish-blue.
