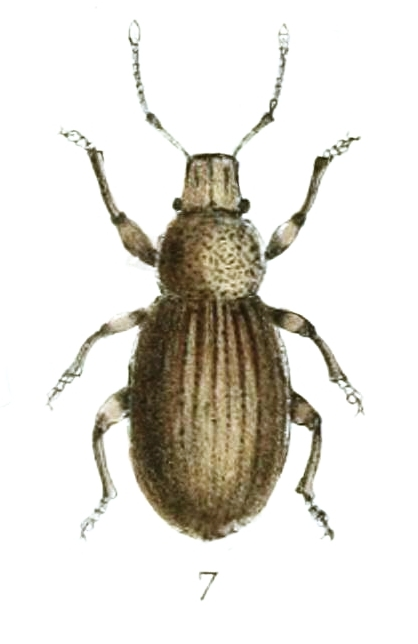

Conservation status
- Extinct (yes) (IUCN 3.1)

Scientific classification
- Kingdom: Animalia
- Phylum: Arthropoda
- Clade: Pancrustacea
- Class: Insecta
- Order: Coleoptera
- Suborder: Polyphaga
- Infraorder: Cucujiformia
- Superfamily: Curculionoidea
- Family: Curculionidae
- Genus: †Neocnemis
- Species: †N. occidentalis

Binomial name
- †Neocnemis occidentalis Crotch, 1867

= Neocnemis occidentalis =

Species of beetle

Neocnemis occidentalis is a species of weevil endemic to Santa Maria Island in the Azores. The species is currently considered extinct.
