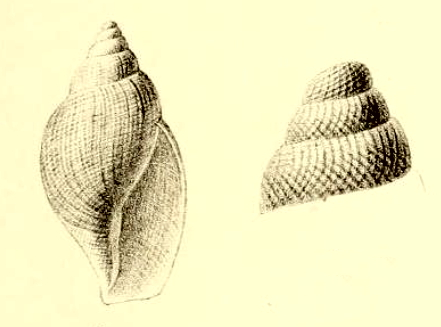
- Shell and protoconch of Lusitanops lusitanicus

Scientific classification
- Kingdom: Animalia
- Phylum: Mollusca
- Class: Gastropoda
- Subclass: Caenogastropoda
- Order: Neogastropoda
- Superfamily: Conoidea
- Family: Raphitomidae
- Genus: Lusitanops; Nordsieck, 1968

Type species
- Pleurotomella lusitanica Sykes, 1906

Species
- See text

= Lusitanops =

Genus of sea snails

Lusitanops is a genus of sea snails, marine gastropod mollusks in the family Raphitomidae.

== Description ==
This genus is characterized by a reticulated sculpture, a large, inflated body whorl, a short siphonal canal and the lack of a sinus.

Fossils of Lusitanops gigasei were found in Pliocene strata at Kallo, Belgium; age range: 6 to 2.588 Ma.

== Species ==
Species within the genus Lusitanops include:

- Lusitanops blanchardi (Dautzenberg & Fischer, 1896)
- Lusitanops bullioides (Sykes, 1906)
- Lusitanops cingulatus Bouchet & Warén, 1980
- Lusitanops dictyota Sysoev, 1997
- Lusitanops expansus (Sars G.O., 1878)
- † Lusitanops gigasei Marquet 1998
- Lusitanops hyaloides (Dautzenberg, 1925)
- Lusitanops lusitanicus (Sykes, 1906)
- Lusitanops macrapex Bouchet & Warén, 1980
- Lusitanops sigmoideus Bouchet & Warén, 1980

Species brought into synonymy

- † Lusitanops bulbiformis Lozouet, 1999: synonym of † Pseudolusitanops bulbiformis (Lozouet, 1999) (original combination)
- Lusitanops cingulata: synonym of Lusitanops cingulatus Bouchet & Warén, 1980
- Lusitanops expansa (Sars G. O., 1878): synonym of Lusitanops expansus (Sars G. O., 1878)
- Lusitanops lusitanica [sic] : synonym of Lusitanops lusitanicus (Sykes, 1906)
- Lusitanops sigmoidea: synonym of Lusitanops sigmoideus Bouchet & Warén, 1980
