= Lusitanops dictyota =

Scientific classification
- Kingdom: Animalia
- Phylum: Mollusca
- Class: Gastropoda
- Subclass: Caenogastropoda
- Order: Neogastropoda
- Superfamily: Conoidea
- Family: Raphitomidae
- Genus: Lusitanops
- Species: L. dictyota

Binomial name
- Lusitanops dictyota (Sysoev, 1997)

Synonyms
- Clinuropsis dictyota (Sysoev, 1997)

Species of sea snail

Lusitanops dictyota is a species of sea snail, a marine gastropod mollusk in the family Raphitomidae.

== Distribution ==
This species occurs in the Arafura Sea off Papua New Guinea and off the Tanimbar Island, Indonesia.
