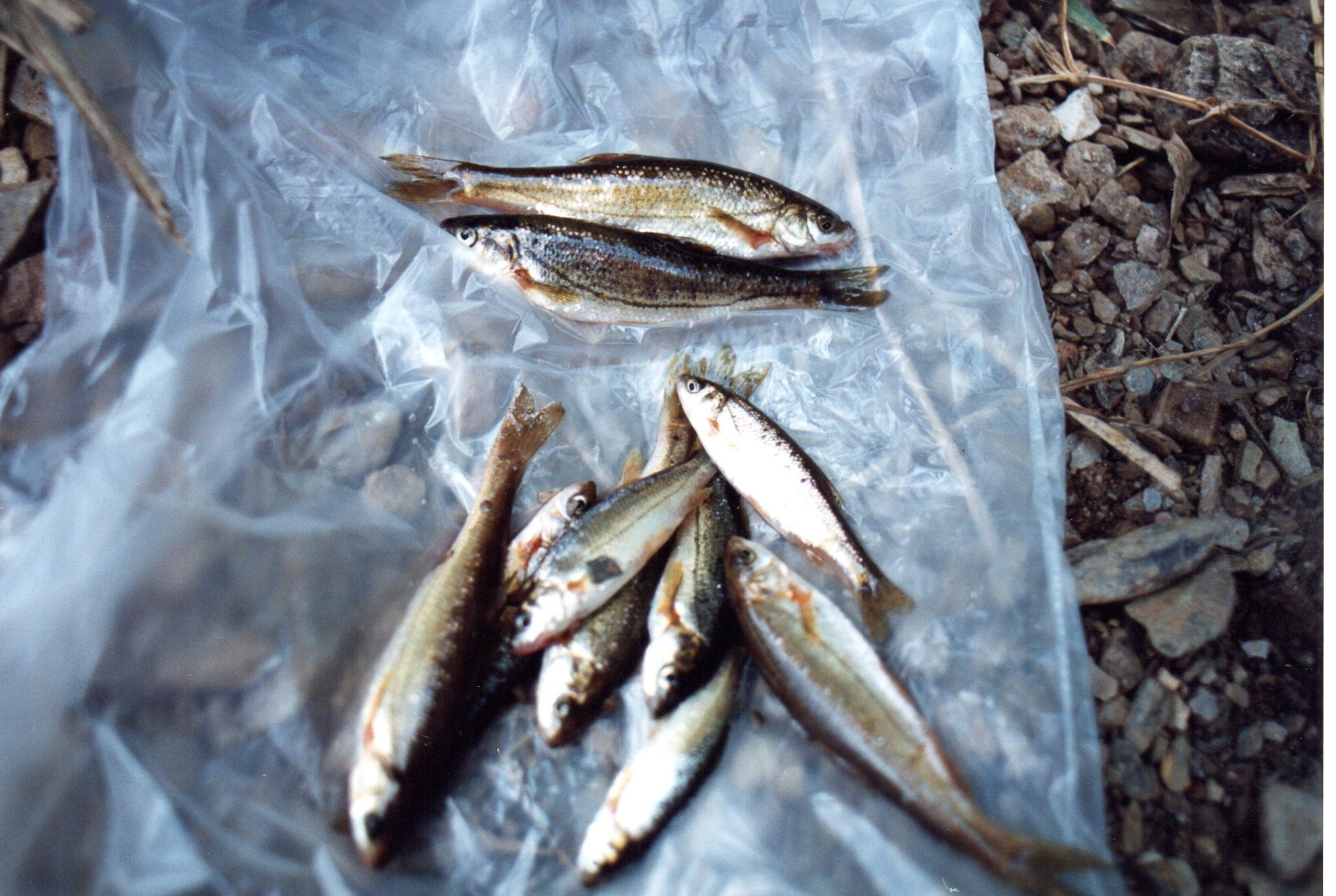

Conservation status
- Endangered (IUCN 3.1)

Scientific classification
- Kingdom: Animalia
- Phylum: Chordata
- Class: Actinopterygii
- Order: Cypriniformes
- Family: Leuciscidae
- Subfamily: Leuciscinae
- Genus: Iberochondrostoma
- Species: I. almacai

Binomial name
- Iberochondrostoma almacai (M. M. Coelho, Mesquita & Collares-Pereira, 2005)

Synonyms
- Chondrostoma almacai Coelho, Mesquita & Collares-Pereira, 2005

= Iberochondrostoma almacai =

Species of fish

Iberochondrostoma almacai, the Southwestern arched-mouth nase, is a species of freshwater ray-finned fish belonging to the family Leuciscidae. This species is endemic to southern Portugal, where it is only found in the drainages of the Mira, Arade and Bensafrim rivers. It shelters in pools when the rivers shrink in the summer and is threatened by habitat destruction caused by water abstraction and predation and competition from introduced species of fish such as Gambusia, Micropterus and Lepomis.
