= Carabus lusitanicus lusitanicus =

Scientific classification
- Kingdom: Animalia
- Phylum: Arthropoda
- Class: Insecta
- Order: Coleoptera
- Suborder: Adephaga
- Family: Carabidae
- Genus: Carabus
- Species: C. lusitanicus
- Subspecies: C. l. lusitanicus

Trinomial name
- Carabus lusitanicus lusitanicus Fabricius, 1801

Synonyms
- Carabus egesippei La Ferté-Sénectere, 1847 N-Portugal:"Oporto"(=Porto); Carabus schaumi Gaubil, 1849 "Portugal"; Carabus ellwigi Schaum, 1862; Carabus descensus Schaufuss, 1871; Carabus vieirae Oliveira, 1875 CW-Portugal:Leiria; Carabus mediotuberculatus Schaufuss, 1882; Carabus sabrosensis Reitter, 1896 N-Portugal:Sabrosa; Carabus vivesi Jeanne, 1973; Carabus almanzaensis Meyer & Mollard, 2000; Carabus almanzaensis Meyer & Mollard in Deuve, 2003

Subspecies of beetle

Carabus lusitanicus lusitanicus is a subspecies of black-coloured beetle from family Carabidae, found in Portugal and Spain.
