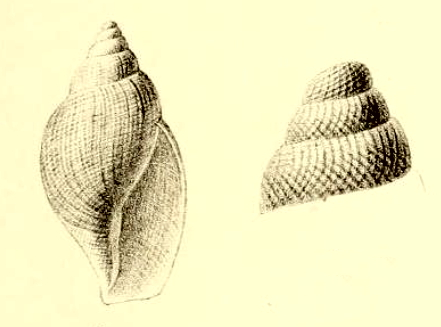
- Original image of the shell and protoconch of Lusitanops lusitanicus

Scientific classification
- Kingdom: Animalia
- Phylum: Mollusca
- Class: Gastropoda
- Subclass: Caenogastropoda
- Order: Neogastropoda
- Superfamily: Conoidea
- Family: Raphitomidae
- Genus: Lusitanops
- Species: L. lusitanicus

Binomial name
- Lusitanops lusitanicus (Sykes, 1906)

Synonyms
- Pleurotomella lusitanica Sykes, 1906; Lusitanops lusitanica (incorrect gender ending)

= Lusitanops lusitanicus =

Species of sea snail

Lusitanops lusitanicus is a species of sea snail, a marine gastropod mollusk in the family Raphitomidae.

== Description ==
The length of the shell attains 6 millimetres (0.24 in). Its diameter is 3 millimetres (0.12 in). The shell is moderately elongated, somewhat fusiform in shape, the spire well raised. Its colour is white, the protoconch stained with chestnut. The shell contains about seven whorls, rather flattened, with a well-marked suture. The protoconch contains three whorls, the first being almost smooth and the others decussated by arcuate riblets. The remaining whorls are sculptured spirally by numerous flat, broad riblets, which (under a lens) are seen to be about twice as wide as their interstices, and to be crossed by lines of growth, which give them a roughened or scabrous appearance. The body whorl is large. The aperture is somewhat squared at the base, and has no noticeable sinus. The outer lip is thin and regularly arcuate. The columella is fairly straight above, a trifle twisted at the base, and has a light callus on its lower portion.

== Distribution ==
This marine species occurs off Portugal.
