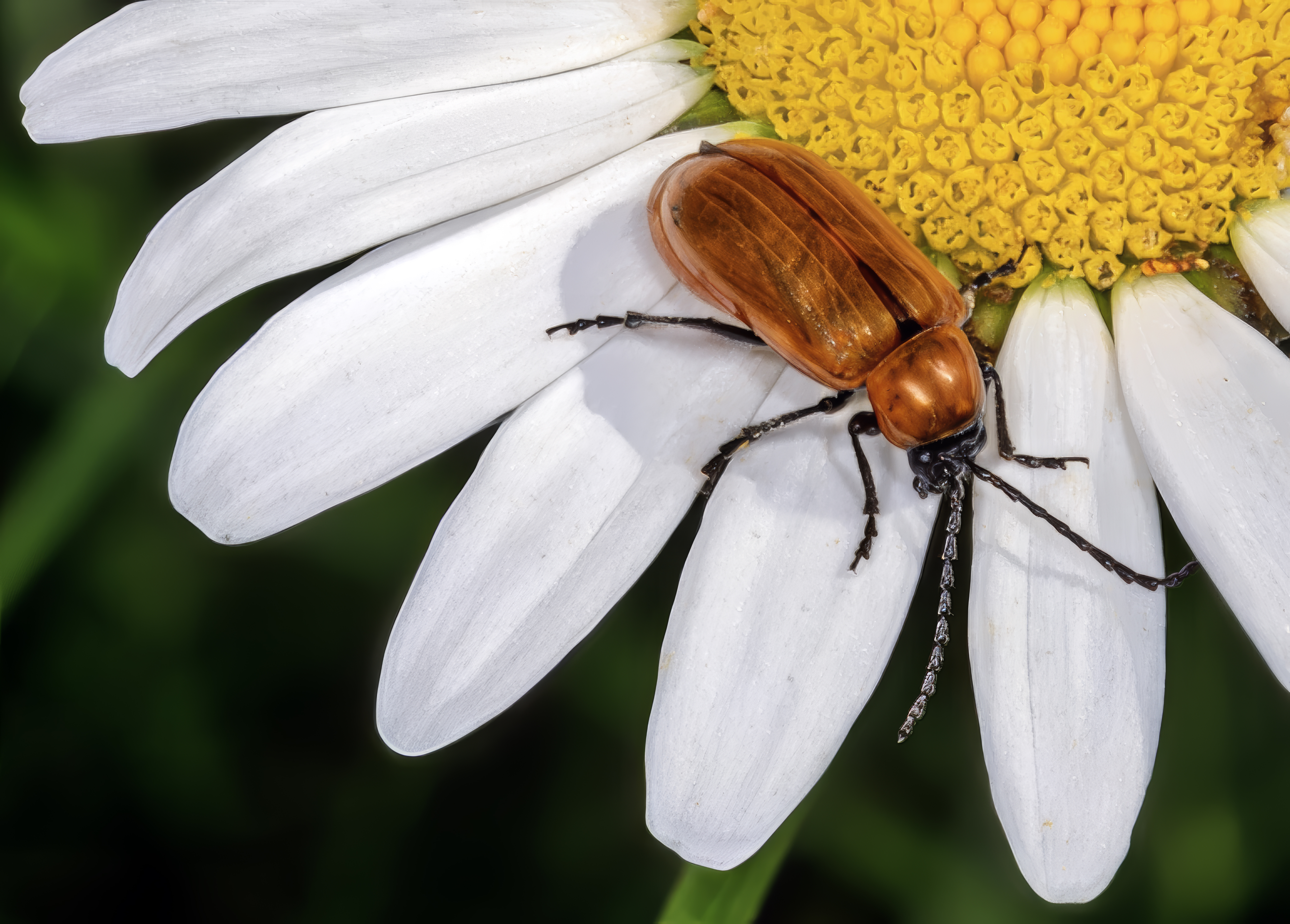
- Upperside
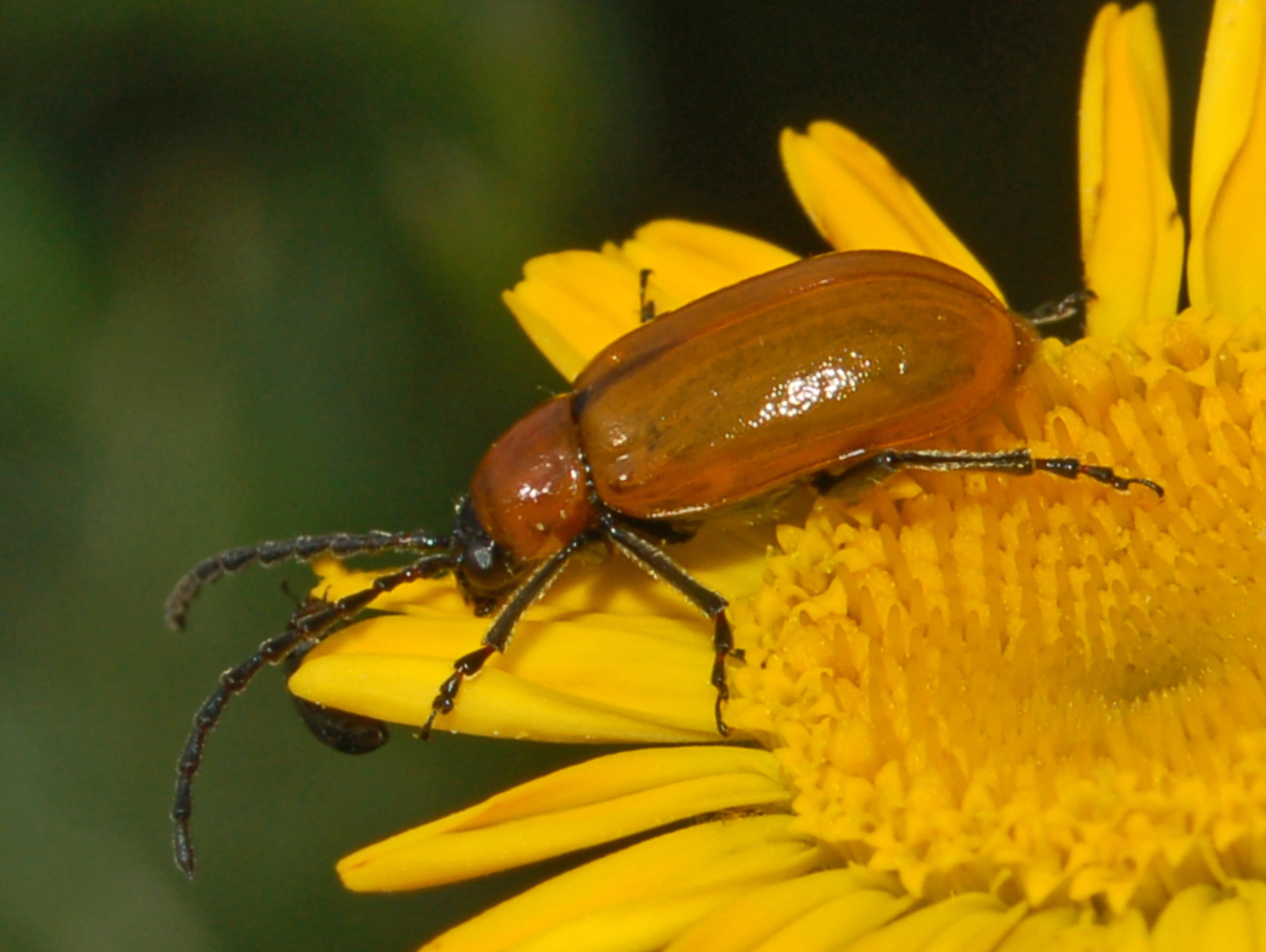
- Side view

Scientific classification
- Kingdom: Animalia
- Phylum: Arthropoda
- Clade: Pancrustacea
- Class: Insecta
- Order: Coleoptera
- Suborder: Polyphaga
- Infraorder: Cucujiformia
- Family: Chrysomelidae
- Genus: Exosoma
- Species: E. lusitanicum

Binomial name
- Exosoma lusitanicum (Linnaeus, 1767)

Synonyms
- List: Chrysomela lusitanica Linnaeus, 1767; Cistela testacea Fabricius, 1775; Crioceris abdominalis Schönherr, 1808 nec Fabricius, 1781; Crioceris nigripes Schönherr, 1808 nec Fabricius, 1775

= Exosoma lusitanicum =

Species of beetle

Exosoma lusitanicum, the daffodil leaf beetle, is a species of skeletonizing leaf beetles belonging to the family Chrysomelidae, subfamily Galerucinae.

== Etymology ==
The genus Exosoma is derived from the ancient Greek ἕξω, meaning outside and σῶμα, meaning body. The Latin species name lusitanicus, meaning occurring in Lusitania (Portugal), refers to the area of distribution of this species.

== Distribution ==
This quite common species is found in France, Italy, Spain, Portugal, North Africa (Morocco, Algeria, Tunisia) and in the Near East.

== Habitat ==
These beetles occur in warm-dry areas, both in the plains as well as at an elevation of a thousand meters.

== Description ==
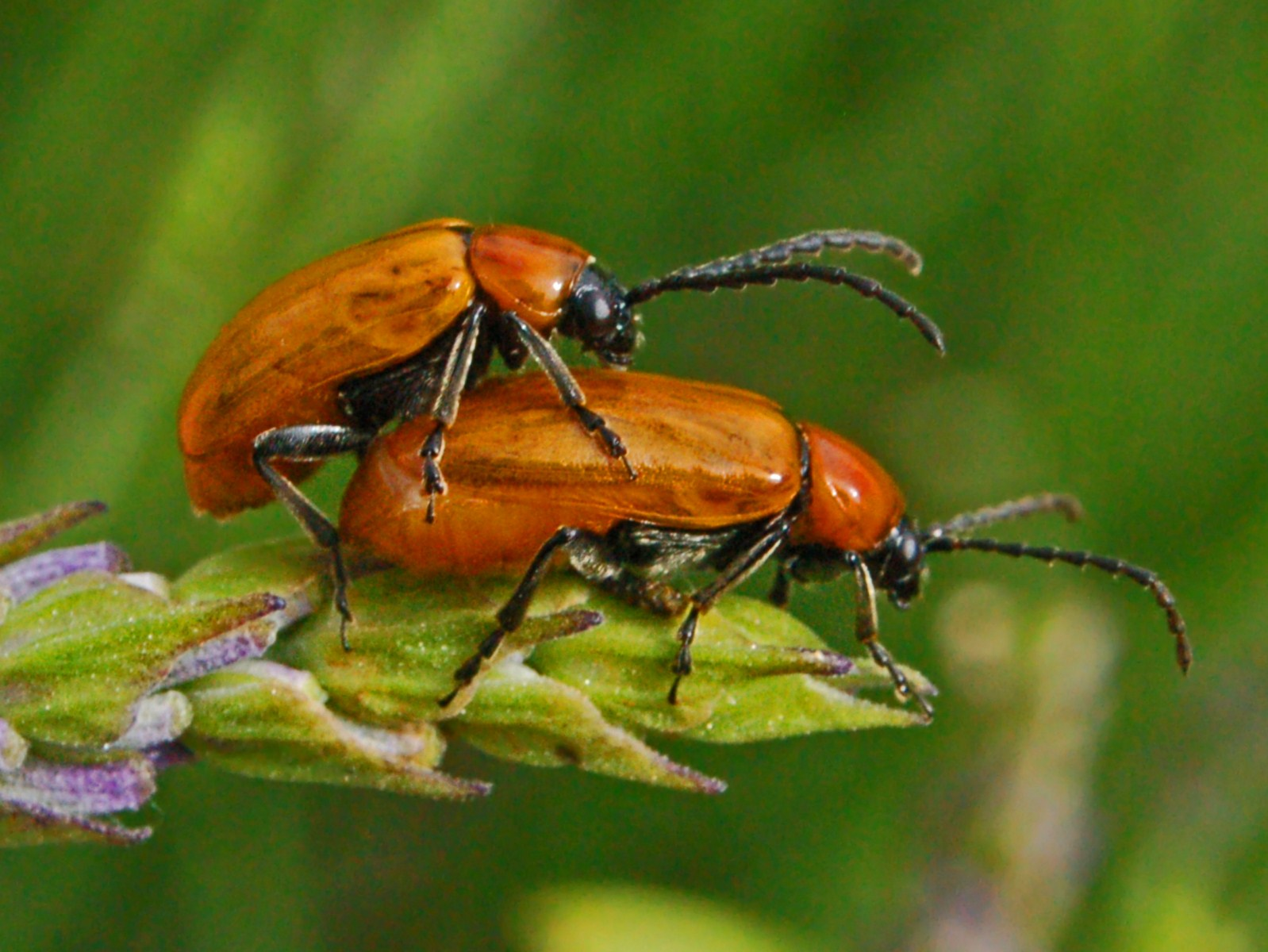
Mating pair

Exosoma lusitanicum can reach a length of 6–8 millimetres (0.24–0.31 in). These small beetles have an elongated, oval and glabrous body. Its pronotum is very finely punctured, convex, and wider than long. Elytra are tight and finely punctured. The basic colour of the pronotum and elytra is shiny red-orange. The head, the antennae, the legs and the abdomen are black.

This species is similar to Exososoma theryi.

== Biology ==
Larvae feed on bulbs of Amaryllidaceae (for instance Narcissus tazetta) and Liliaceae species, while adults feed on flowers of several wild plants, mainly Asteraceae species and are potentially dangerous for vineyards.
