= Neocnemis =

Scientific classification
- Kingdom: Animalia
- Phylum: Arthropoda
- Class: Insecta
- Order: Coleoptera
- Suborder: Polyphaga
- Infraorder: Cucujiformia
- Family: Curculionidae
- Genus: †Neocnemis; Crotch, 1867

Genus of insects

Neocnemis is a genus of beetles belonging to the family Curculionidae.

Species:

- Neocnemis occidentalis Crotch, 1867
