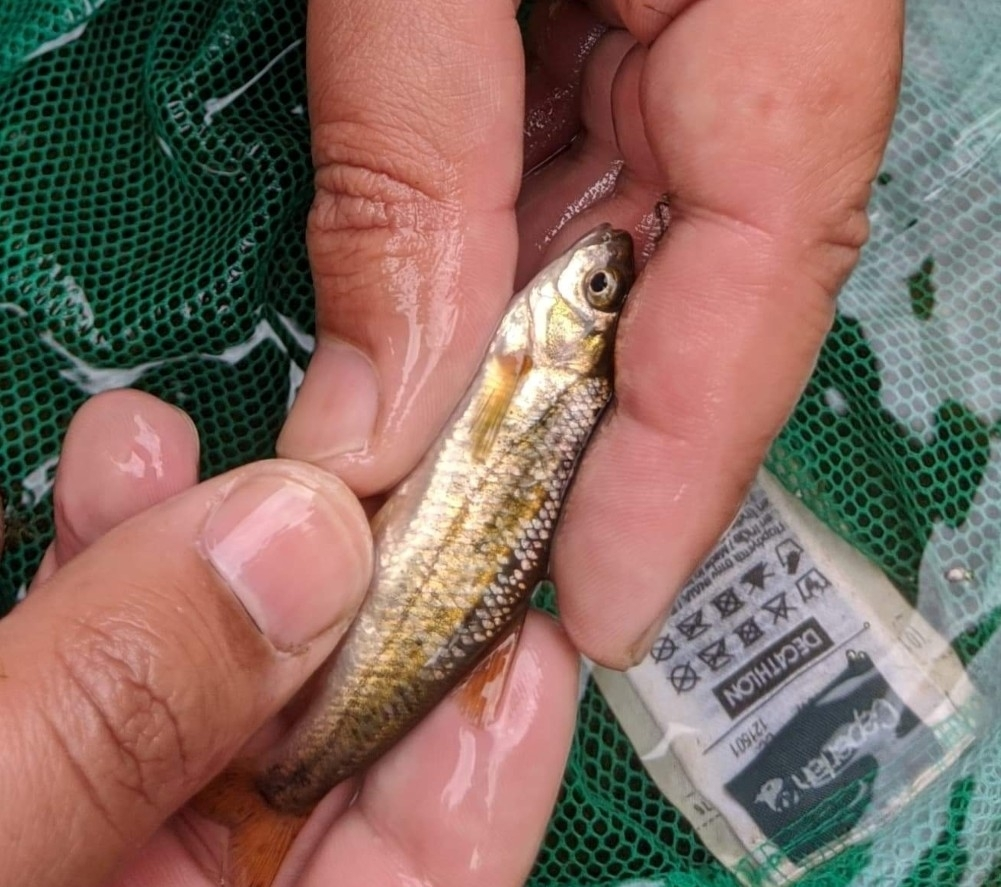

Conservation status
- Near Threatened (IUCN 3.1)

Scientific classification
- Kingdom: Animalia
- Phylum: Chordata
- Class: Actinopterygii
- Order: Cypriniformes
- Family: Leuciscidae
- Subfamily: Leuciscinae
- Genus: Iberochondrostoma
- Species: I. lusitanicum

Binomial name
- Iberochondrostoma lusitanicum (Collares-Pereira, 1980)
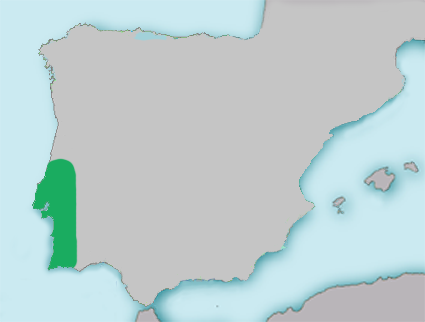

Synonyms
- Chondrostoma lusitanicum Collares-Pereira, 1980; Rutilus lusitanicus (Collares-Pereira, 1980)

= Iberochondrostoma lusitanicum =

Species of fish

Iberochondrostoma lusitanicum, or the boga-portuguesa or Portuguese arched-mouth nase, is a species of freshwater ray-finned fish belonging to the family Leuciscidae, which includes the daces, minnows and related fishes. This species is endemic to Portugal.

== Taxonomy ==
Iberochondrostoma lusitanicum was first formally described as Chondrostoma lusitanicum in 1980 by the Portuguese zoologist Maria João Collares-Pereira with its type locality given as the Río Xarrama in the Sado River basin in Portugal. In 2006 Joana Isabel Robalo, Vítor Carvalho Almada, André Levy Coelho and Ignacio Doadrio found that Chondrostoma was paraphyletic and proposed a number of new genera be defined, including Iberochondrostoma which was a genus of four species of minnow with Leuciscus lemmingi as the type species found on the Atlantic coastal slope of the southern and central Iberian Peninsula, with this species included. The genus Iberochondrostoma is classified within the subfamily Leuciscinae of the family Leuciscidae.

== Etymology ==
Iberochondrostoma lusitanicum belongs to the genus Iberochondrostoma, a name which prefixes Ibero- to denote the Iberian Peninsula with Chondrostoma, the genus in which these fishes were formerly classified in. The specific name, lusitanicum, means "belonging to Lusitania", Lusitania being the ancient name for Portugal, where this species is endemic.

== Identification ==
Iberochondrostoma lusitanicum has both its dorsal fin and its anal fin supported by 3 spines and between 6 and 8 soft rays. It is distinguished from other members of the genus Iberochondrostoma by the diameter of its eye being greater than length of the snout and by typically having between 43 and 47 on its lateral line with 3 1/2 to 5 scale rows between the lateral line and the origin of the pelvic fin. The boga-portuguesa has a maximum total length of 15.1 cm (5.9 in).

== Distribution and habitat ==
Iberochondrostoma lusitanicum is endemic to Portugal where it is found in the lower Tagus and in nearby river systems from the Lizandro south to the Ribeira da Junqueira stream at Sines. The boga-portuguesa is found in the upper reaches of coastal streams and small rivers where the current is slow and where there are significant variations to the discharge of these streams with some stretches drying out seasonally. In dry periods some fish take refuge in shaded isolated pools and recolonise the waterway from these in wetter periods. There is a resident population in the Lagoa de Albufeira at Setúbal.

== Biology ==
Iberochondrostoma lusitanicum gathers in large aggregations to spawn, a single female spawns with one or a few males. The males press the female against the substrate and her eggs are released. The movements of the spawning group attract other individuals to spawn too. Spawning aggregations disperse after about 20-60 seconds and may reform several times. The females deposit eggs that adhere to the substrate.

== Conservation ==
Iberochondrostoma lusitanicum is classified as Near-threatened by the International Union for Conservation of Nature. It is threatened by pollution, abstraction, damming, climate change, habitat loss and non-native invasive species. In turn this species is regarded as a major threat to the closely related Portuguese endemic fish, the Lisbon arch-mouthed nase (I. olisiponensis) as it hybridises with it in the Tagus.
