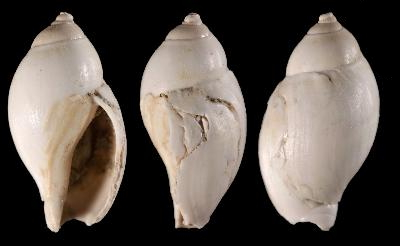
- Shell of Pseudolusitanops bulbiformis (holotype at MNHN, Paris)

Scientific classification
- Kingdom: Animalia
- Phylum: Mollusca
- Class: Gastropoda
- Subclass: Caenogastropoda
- Order: Neogastropoda
- Superfamily: Conoidea
- Family: Raphitomidae
- Genus: †Pseudolusitanops
- Species: †P. bulbiformis

Binomial name
- †Pseudolusitanops bulbiformis (Lozouet, 1999)

Synonyms
- † Lusitanops bulbiformis Lozouet, 1999

= Pseudolusitanops bulbiformis =

Extinct species of sea snail

Pseudolusitanops bulbiformis is an extinct species of sea snail, a marine gastropod mollusc in the family Raphitomidae.

== Description ==
More commonly known as the Lusitanops, the Pseudolusitanops bulbiformis was accepted as a species in the late 1900s. The only form of this creature remaining is fossils. The length of the shell attains 5.6 mm.

== Distribution ==
Fossils of this extinct marine species were found in Oligocene strata in Aquitaine, France.
