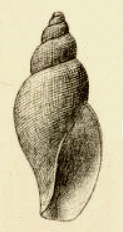
- Original image of a shell of Lusitanops expansus

Scientific classification
- Kingdom: Animalia
- Phylum: Mollusca
- Class: Gastropoda
- Subclass: Caenogastropoda
- Order: Neogastropoda
- Superfamily: Conoidea
- Family: Raphitomidae
- Genus: Lusitanops
- Species: L. expansus

Binomial name
- Lusitanops expansus (Sars G.O., 1878)

Synonyms
- Bela expansa Sars G. O., 1878 (original combination); Lusitanops expansa (Sars G. O., 1878)

= Lusitanops expansus =

Species of sea snail

Lusitanops expansus is a species of deep water sea snail, a marine gastropod mollusk in the family Raphitomidae.

== Description ==
The length of the shell attains 9 millimetres (0.35 in).

== Distribution ==
This species occurs off Arctic Ocean, Norway in the North Atlantic Ocean.
