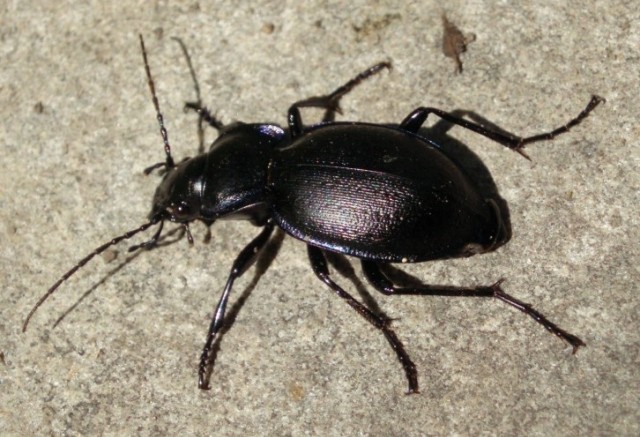

Scientific classification
- Domain: Eukaryota
- Kingdom: Animalia
- Phylum: Arthropoda
- Class: Insecta
- Order: Coleoptera
- Suborder: Adephaga
- Family: Carabidae
- Subfamily: Carabinae
- Tribe: Carabini
- Genus: Carabus
- Species: C. lusitanicus

Binomial name
- Carabus lusitanicus Fabricius, 1801

Synonyms
- Carabus macrocephalus

= Carabus lusitanicus =

Species of beetle

Carabus lusitanicus is a species of beetle from family Carabidae that is endemic to Iberia. It has three subspecies, C. l. breuningi, C. l. brevis, and C. l. lusitanicus.
