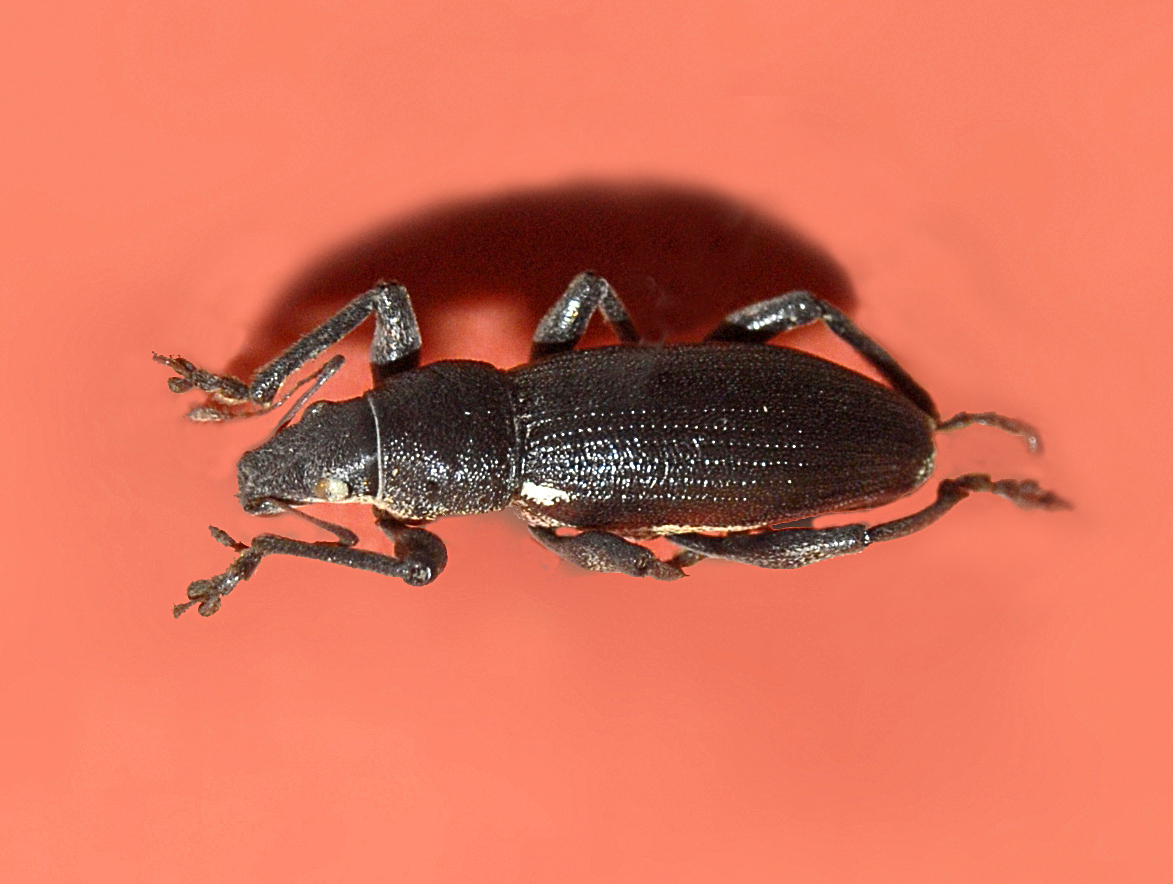
- Museum specimen of Brachyderes lusitanicus

Scientific classification
- Kingdom: Animalia
- Phylum: Arthropoda
- Clade: Pancrustacea
- Class: Insecta
- Order: Coleoptera
- Suborder: Polyphaga
- Infraorder: Cucujiformia
- Superfamily: Curculionoidea
- Family: Curculionidae
- Genus: Brachyderes
- Species: B. lusitanicus

Binomial name
- Brachyderes lusitanicus Fabricius 1781

= Brachyderes lusitanicus =

Pine weevil

Species of beetle

Brachyderes lusitanicus, the pine weevil, is a species in the weevil family (Curculionidae). This weevil can reach a length around 8 mm. It occurs in Portugal, Spain, and France.
