= List of critically endangered invertebrates =

- Extinct in the wild (EW): 2 species
- Critically endangered (CR): 853 species
- Endangered (EN): 1,533 species
- Vulnerable (VU): 1,578 species
- Near threatened (NT, LR/cd): 1,119 species
- Least concern (LC): 8,632 species
- Data deficient (DD): 4,644 species
Invertebrate species (IUCN, 2025.2)
- 18,442 extant species have been evaluated
- 13,798 of those are fully assessed (Note: excludes data deficient evaluations.)
- 9,751 are not threatened at present
- 4,047 to 8,691 are threatened (Note: Threatened comprises CR, EN and VU. Upper estimate additionally includes DD.)
- 83 to 255 are extinct or extinct in the wild:
  - 81 extinct (EX) species (Note: Chart omits extinct (EX) species)
  - 2 extinct in the wild (EW)
  - 171 possibly extinct [CR(PE)]
  - 1 possibly extinct in the wild [CR(PEW)]

Critically endangered (CR) species face an extremely high risk of extinction in the wild.

As of July 2016, the International Union for Conservation of Nature (IUCN) listed 987 critically endangered invertebrate species, including 206 which are tagged as possibly extinct. Of all evaluated invertebrate species, 5.5% are listed as critically endangered. The IUCN also lists 14 invertebrate subspecies as critically endangered.

No subpopulations of invertebrates have been evaluated by the IUCN.

Additionally 5278 invertebrate species (29% of those evaluated) are listed as data deficient, meaning there is insufficient information for a full assessment of conservation status. As these species typically have small distributions and/or populations, they are intrinsically likely to be threatened, according to the IUCN. While the category data deficient indicates that no assessment of extinction risk has been made for the taxa, the IUCN notes that it may be appropriate to give them "the same degree of attention as threatened taxa, at least until their status can be assessed".

This is a complete list of critically endangered invertebrate species and subspecies as evaluated by the IUCN. Species considered possibly extinct by the IUCN are marked as such.

== Nemertea ==
- Prosadenoporus agricola (possibly extinct)

== Annelids ==
- Mesonerilla prospera

== Onychophora ==
- Pink velvet worm (Opisthopatus roseus)
- Lion's Hill velvet worm (Peripatopsis leonina)
- Speleoperipatus spelaeus

== Molluscs ==

- Extinct in the wild (EW): 12 species
- Critically endangered (CR): 785 species
- Endangered (EN): 708 species
- Vulnerable (VU): 1,123 species
- Near threatened (NT, LR/cd): 823 species
- Least concern (LC): 3,526 species
- Data deficient (DD): 2,229 species
Mollusc species (IUCN, 2025.2)
- 9,502 extant species have been evaluated
- 7,273 of those are fully assessed (Note: excludes data deficient evaluations.)
- 4,358 are not threatened at present
- 2,915 to 5,144 are threatened (Note: Threatened comprises CR, EN and VU. Upper estimate additionally includes DD.)
- 308 to 476 are extinct or extinct in the wild:
  - 296 extinct (EX) species (Note: Chart omits extinct (EX) species)
  - 12 extinct in the wild (EW)
  - 167 possibly extinct [CR(PE)]
  - 1 possibly extinct in the wild [CR(PEW)]

There are 581 mollusc species and 11 mollusc subspecies assessed as critically endangered.

=== Gastropods ===
There are 511 gastropod species and six gastropod subspecies assessed as critically endangered.

==== Stylommatophora ====
Stylommatophora includes the majority of land snails and slugs. There are 233 species and five subspecies in the order Stylommatophora assessed as critically endangered.

===== Amastrids =====
- Amastra cylindrica
- Amastra micans
- Amastra rubens
- Amastra spirizona
- Armsia petasus
- Laminella sanguinea
- Tropidoptera heliciformis

===== Partulids =====
- Eua globosa (possibly extinct)
- Partula affinis
- Partula calypso
- Partula clara
- Partula emersoni
- Fat Guam partula (Partula gibba)
- Partula langfordi
- Partula leucothoe (possibly extinct)
- Partula martensiana
- Partula milleri (possibly extinct)
- Polynesian tree snails (Partula otaheitana)
- Radiolate partula (Partula radiolata)
- Partula subgonochila
- Moorean viviparous tree snail (Partula taeniata)
- Short Samoan tree snail (Samoana abbreviata)
- Samoana attenuata
- Samoana bellula
- Samoana burchi
- Samoana cramptoni (possibly extinct)
- Samoana decussatula
- Samoana dryas
- Samoana fragilis
- Samoana hamadryas
- Samoana meyeri
- Samoana oreas
- Samoana strigata

===== Achatinellids =====
- Achatinella apexfulva
- Achatinella bellula
- Achatinella bulimoides
- Achatinella byronii
- Achatinella cestus
- Achatinella concavospira
- Achatinella curta
- Achatinella decipiens
- Achatinella fulgens
- Achatinella fuscobasis
- Achatinella leucorrhaphe
- Achatinella lila
- Achatinella lorata
- Achatinella mustelina
- Achatinella phaeozona
- Achatinella pulcherrima
- Achatinella pupukanioe
- Achatinella sowerbyana
- Achatinella stewartii
- Achatinella swiftii
- Achatinella taeniolata
- Achatinella turgida
- Achatinella viridans
- Achatinella vulpina
- Gulickia alexandri
- Partulina confusa
- Partulina dubia

===== Endodontids =====
Species

- Aaadonta angaurana (possibly extinct)
- Aaadonta irregularis
- Aaadonta kinlochi (possibly extinct)
- Aaadonta pelewana (possibly extinct)
- Cookeconcha contorta
- Endodonta apiculata (possibly extinct)
- Priceconcha tuvuthaensis
- Thaumatodon corrugata
- Thaumatodon spirrhymatum

Subspecies

- Aaadonta constricta babelthuapi
- Aaadonta constricta constricta
- Aaadonta constricta komakanensis
- Aaadonta fuscozonata depressa
- Aaadonta fuscozonata fuscozonata

===== Charopids =====
- Charopa lafargei
- Ammonite snail (Helenoconcha relicta)
- Kondoconcha othnius
- Lauopa mbalavuana (possibly extinct)
- Maafu thaumasius
- Mautodontha boraborensis
- Mautodontha ceuthma
- Opanara altiapica
- Opanara areaensis
- Opanara bitridentata
- Opanara caliculata
- Opanara depasoapicata
- Opanara duplicidentata
- Opanara fosbergi
- Opanara megomphala
- Opanara perahuensis
- Orangia maituatensis
- Palline notera
- Radioconus goeldi
- Rhysoconcha variumbilicata
- Ruatara koarana
- Semperdon kororensis
- Semperdon xyleborus
- Sinployea angularis
- Sinployea navutuenis
- Dlinza Forest pinwheel (Trachycystis clifdeni)
- Trachycystis placenta
- Vatusila kondoi
- Vatusila nayauana

===== Helicarionids =====
- Coneuplecta turrita (possibly extinct)
- Erepta stylodon
- Harmogenanina implicata
- Sesara sp. nov. 'Bai Voi'
- Zingis radiolata (possibly extinct)

===== Orthalicids =====
- Bulimulus achatellinus (possibly extinct)
- Bulimulus adelphus (possibly extinct)
- Bulimulus adserseni
- Bulimulus chemitzioides
- Bulimulus curtus
- Bulimulus deridderi (possibly extinct)
- Bulimulus duncanus (possibly extinct)
- Bulimulus eos (possibly extinct)
- Bulimulus eschariferus
- Bulimulus galapaganus
- Bulimulus habeli
- Bulimulus hirsutus
- Bulimulus indefatigabilis
- Bulimulus jacobi
- Bulimulus lycodus (possibly extinct)
- Bulimulus ochsneri
- Bulimulus reibischi
- Bulimulus saeronius (possibly extinct)
- Bulimulus sculpturatus
- Bulimulus sp. nov. 'josevillani' (possibly extinct)
- Bulimulus sp. nov. 'krameri' (possibly extinct)
- Bulimulus sp. nov. 'nilsodhneri' (possibly extinct)
- Bulimulus sp. nov. 'tuideroyi' (possibly extinct)
- Bulimulus sp. nov. 'vanmoli' (possibly extinct)
- Bulimulus tanneri (possibly extinct)
- Bulimulus wolfi
- Leuchocharis pancheri
- Lord Howe flax snail (Placostylus bivaricosus)
- Placostylus koroensis (possibly extinct)
- Placostylus mbengensis

===== Rhytidids =====
- Delos gardineri (possibly extinct)
- Pondoland cannibal snail (Natalina beyrichi)
- Ouagapia ratusukuni
- Rhytida clarki
- Rhytida oconnori

===== Streptaxids =====
- Conturbatia crenata (possibly extinct)
- Glabrennea silhouettensis
- Glabrennea thomasseti
- Gonospira duponti
- Gulella puzeyi
- Gulella salpinx
- Priodiscus spinosus

===== Lauriids =====
- Leiostyla abbreviata (possibly extinct)
- Leiostyla cassida (possibly extinct)
- Leiostyla cassidula
- Leiostyla gibba (possibly extinct)
- Leiostyla simulator (possibly extinct)

===== Helicids =====
- Assyriella rechingeri
- Chilostoma crombezi
- Chilostoma harpya
- Hemicycla efferata
- Hemicycla mascaensis
- Hemicycla modesta (possibly extinct)
- Hemicycla paeteliana
- Hemicycla plicaria
- Hemicycla saulcyi
- Idiomela subplicata
- Tacheocampylaea romagnolii
- Theba arinagae
- Corsican snail (Tyrrhenaria ceratina)
- Tyrrheniberus sardonius

===== Hygromiids =====
- Actinella arridens
- Actinella obserata
- Canariella jandiaensis
- Canariella ronceroi
- Caseolus subcalliferus
- Cernuella amanda
- Cernuella aradasii
- Discula bulverii
- Discula lyelliana (possibly extinct)
- Discula tabellata
- Discula testudinalis
- Discula tetrica (possibly extinct)
- Geomitra delphinuloides (possibly extinct)
- Geomitra grabhami (possibly extinct)
- Ichnusomunda sacchii
- Lemniscia galeata
- Leptaxis vetusa
- Montserratina becasis (possibly extinct)
- Pyrenaearia molae
- Trochoidea pseudojacosta
- Xerosecta giustii

===== Enids =====
- Euchondrus ramonensis
- Napaeus exilis
- Napaeus isletae
- Napaeus osoriensis
- Napaeus teobaldoi
- Pene galilaea

===== Other Stylommatophora species =====
- Atlantica guerinianus
- Bertia cambojiensis
- Cecilioides eulima
- Cecilioides jeskalovicensis
- Cerion nanus
- Draparnaudia anniae
- Draparnaudia subnecata
- Dupontia levensonia
- Gonyostomus gonyostomus
- Gyliotrachela luctans
- Helicostyla smargadina
- Banded dune snail (Helminthoglypta walkeriana)
- Hirinaba curytibana
- Hypselostoma elephas
- Magazine Mountain middle-toothed snail (Inflectarius magazinensis)
- Lampedusa melitensis
- Megalobulimus grandis
- Megalobulimus proclivis
- Fraternal snail (Micrarionta feralis)
- Monilearia arguineguinensis
- Monilearia granostriata
- Monilearia pulverulenta (possibly extinct)
- Monilearia tumulorum
- Orcula fuchsi
- Oxyloma kanabense
- Pachnodus oxoniensis
- Paraboysidia serpa
- Plutonia angulosa
- Plutonia falcifera
- Plutonia machadoi
- Plutonia reticulata
- Catalina mountain snail (Radiocentrum avalonense)
- Succinea rotumana (possibly extinct)
- Trochochlamys ogasawarana
- Trochomorpha kambarae
- Trochomorpha moalensis
- Trochomorpha planoconus
- Trochomorpha tuvuthae
- Videna pagodula
- Videna pumila
- Zilchogyra paulistana

==== Littorinimorpha ====
There are 181 species in the order Littorinimorpha assessed as critically endangered.

===== Hydrobiids =====
- Alzoniella galaica (possibly extinct)
- Alzoniella iberopyrenaica
- Alzoniella marianae
- Alzoniella onatensis
- Attebania bernasconii
- Beddomeia tumida (possibly extinct)
- Belgrandia alcoaensis
- Belgrandia bonelliana
- Belgrandia moitessieri (possibly extinct)
- Belgrandia varica (possibly extinct)
- Belgrandiella austriana
- Belgrandiella bachkovoensis
- Belgrandiella boetersi (possibly extinct)
- Belgrandiella cavernica (possibly extinct)
- Belgrandiella ganslmayri
- Belgrandiella kreisslorum (possibly extinct)
- Belgrandiella mimula
- Belgrandiella multiformis (possibly extinct)
- Belgrandiella parreyssii
- Belgrandiella pelerei
- Belgrandiella styriaca
- Bythinella cylindrica
- Bythinella eutrepha (possibly extinct)
- Bythinella gloeeri
- Bythinella lunzensis
- Bythinella markovi
- Bythinella turca
- Bythiospeum cisterciensorum
- Bythiospeum dubium (possibly extinct)
- Bythiospeum gonostoma (possibly extinct)
- Bythiospeum husmanni
- Bythiospeum pellucidum
- Bythiospeum pfeifferi
- Bythiospeum putei (possibly extinct)
- Bythiospeum tschapecki
- Bythiospeum turritum (possibly extinct)
- Bythiospeum wiaaiglica
- Caledoconcha carnosa
- Coahuilix de hubbs snail (Coahuilix hubbsi)
- Costellina turrita
- Dalmatella sketi
- Daphniola louisi
- Delavaya dianchiensis
- Dianella schlickumi (possibly extinct)
- Dianella thiesseana
- Falsipyrgula beysehirana (possibly extinct)
- Fluvidona petterdi
- Giustia costata
- Giustia mellalensis
- Giustia saidai
- Gocea ohridana
- Graecoanatolica brevis (possibly extinct)
- Graecoanatolica conica (possibly extinct)
- Graecoanatolica vegorriticola
- Graecorientalia vrissiana
- Graziana adlitzensis
- Grossuana thracica
- Hadopyrgus ngataana
- Hadziella rudnicae
- Hauffenia edlingeri
- Hauffenia tovunica
- Heideella sp. nov. 'valai'
- Hemistomia aquilonaris
- Hemistomia crosseana
- Hemistomia gorotitei
- Hemistomia lacinia
- Hemistomia neku
- Hemistomia shostakovichi
- Hemistomia whiteleggei
- Hemistomia xaracuu
- Hemistomia yalayu
- Horatia lucidulus
- Hydrobia anatolica (possibly extinct)
- Hydrobia rheophila
- Iglica gratulabunda (possibly extinct)
- Iglica soussensis
- Iglica velkovrhi
- Iglica wolfischeri
- Islamia anatolica
- Islamia bendidis (possibly extinct)
- Islamia bunarbasa
- Islamia graeca (possibly extinct)
- Islamia hadei (possibly extinct)
- Islamia pseudorientalica (possibly extinct)
- Islamia trichoniana
- Islamia zermanica (possibly extinct)
- Jardinella colmani
- Kerkia kusceri
- Kirelia carinata (possibly extinct)
- Kirelia murtici
- Kuschelita inflata
- Kuschelita mica
- Lanzaia skradinensis
- Leiorhagium granum
- Leiorhagium mussorgskyi
- Lyhnidia hadzii
- Lyhnidia karamani
- Lyhnidia stankovici
- Malaprespia albanica
- Beaverpond marstonia (Marstonia castor)
- Ozark pyrg (Marstonia ozarkensis) (possibly extinct)
- Marstoniopsis armoricana
- Marstoniopsis vrbasi
- Mercuria punica (possibly extinct)
- Mercuria sarahae
- Ohridohauffenia minuta (possibly extinct)
- Paladilhiopsis janinensis (possibly extinct)
- Paladilhiopsis neaaugustensis
- Parabythinella graeca
- Parabythinella malaprespensis
- Plagigeyeria montenigrina
- Plagigeyeria tribunicae
- Potamopyrgus acus (possibly extinct)
- Potamopyrgus oppidanus
- Prespolitorea malaprespensis
- Prespolitorea valvataeformis
- Pseudamnicola leprevieri
- Pseudamnicola pallaryi
- Pseudoislamia balcanica
- Pyrgohydrobia jablanicensis
- Bruneau hot springsnail (Pyrgulopsis bruneauensis)
- Ash Meadows pebblesnail (Pyrgulopsis erythropoma)
- Socorro springsnail (Pyrgulopsis neomexicana)
- New Mexico hotspring snail (Pyrgulopsis thermalis)
- Three Forks springsnail (Pyrgulopsis trivialis)
- Clear Lake pyrg (Pyrgulopsis ventricosa)
- Radomaniola elongata
- Radomaniola lacustris
- Sadleriana cavernosa
- Sardohoratia sulcata (possibly extinct)
- Zaton cave water snail (Saxurinator labiatus)
- Saxurinator orthodoxus
- Coosa pebblesnail (Somatogyrus coosaensis)
- Stocky pebblesnail (Somatogyrus crassus) (possibly extinct)
- Tennessee pebblesnail (Somatogyrus currierianus) (possibly extinct)
- Fluted pebblesnail (Somatogyrus hendersoni) (possibly extinct)
- Atlas pebblesnail (Somatogyrus humerosus) (possibly extinct)
- Dwarf pebblesnail (Somatogyrus nanus) (possibly extinct)
- Pygmy pebblesnail (Somatogyrus pygmaeus)
- Quadrate pebblesnail (Somatogyrus quadratus)
- Rolling pebblesnail (Somatogyrus strengi)
- Opaque pebblesnail (Somatogyrus tennesseensis)
- Stankovicia baicaliiformis
- Tanousia zrmanjae (possibly extinct)
- Tarraconia gasulli
- Trachyochridia filocincta
- Trichonia trichonica
- Vinodolia hadouphylax
- Vinodolia lacustris
- Vinodolia matjasici
- Zaumia kusceri
- Zaumia sanctizaumi (possibly extinct)

===== Cochliopids =====
- Heleobia dobrogica
- Heleobia tritonum
- Brune's tryonia (Tryonia brunei) (possibly extinct)

===== Bithyniids =====
- Bithynia kastorias
- Gabbia alticola
- Gabbiella candida
- Gabbiella depressa
- Gabbiella matadina (possibly extinct)
- Gabbiella neothaumaeformis
- Gabbiella parva
- Incertihydrobia teesdalei
- Jubaia aethiopica
- Pseudobithynia euboeensis
- Pseudobithynia falniowskii
- Pseudobithynia kathrinae
- Pseudobithynia panetolis
- Sierraia outambensis
- Soapitia dageti (possibly extinct)

===== Moitessieriids =====
- Henrigirardia wienini (possibly extinct)
- Spiralix corsica (possibly extinct)

===== Assimineids =====
- Kubaryia pilikia (possibly extinct)
- Omphalotropis ingens (possibly extinct)
- Pseudogibbula cara (possibly extinct)
- Pseudogibbula duponti
- Septariellina congolensis
- Valvatorbis mauritii (possibly extinct)

===== Pomatiopsids =====
- Tomichia cawstoni
- Tomichia natalensis
- Tomichia tristis

==== Sorbeoconcha ====
- Pleurocera ampla (Elimia ampla)
- Lily Shoals elimia (Elimia annettae)
- Princess elimia (Elimia bellacrenata)
- Mossy elimia (Elimia troostiana) (possibly extinct)
- Leptoxis melanoides
- Plicate rocksnail (Leptoxis plicata)
- Melanoides agglutinans (possibly extinct)
- Melanopsis ammonis
- Melanopsis brevicula
- Melanopsis chlorotica
- Melanopsis germaini (possibly extinct)
- Melanopsis infracincta (possibly extinct)
- Melanopsis khabourensis (possibly extinct)
- Melanopsis pachya (possibly extinct)
- Melanopsis parreyssii
- Melanopsis penchinati
- Melanopsis saharica
- Corpulent hornsnail (Pleurocera corpulenta)
- Potadoma kadeii
- Potadoma wansoni
- Pseudocleopatra dartevellei
- Tylomelania kruimeli

==== Architaenioglossa ====
There are 48 species in the order Architaenioglossa assessed as critically endangered.

===== Cyclophorids =====
- Alycaeus balingensis
- Boucardicus fidimananai
- Boucardicus fortistriatus
- Boucardicus simplex
- Madgeaconcha sevathiani (possibly extinct)

===== Diplommatinids =====
- Arinia boreoborneensis
- Arinia dentifera
- Arinia oviformis
- Arinia simplex
- Diplommatina alata (possibly extinct)
- Diplommatina aurea (possibly extinct)
- Diplommatina cacuminulus
- Diplommatina crassilabris
- Diplommatina gibboni (possibly extinct)
- Diplommatina madaiensis
- Diplommatina ringens
- Opisthostoma decrespignyi (possibly extinct)
- Opisthostoma fraternum
- Opisthostoma inornatum
- Opisthostoma jucundum
- Opisthostoma mirabile
- Opisthostoma otostoma (possibly extinct)
- Opisthostoma perspectivum
- Opisthostoma thersites
- Opisthostoma trapezium
- Palaina albata (possibly extinct)
- Palaina moussoni
- Palaina patula (possibly extinct)
- Palaina platycheilus (possibly extinct)
- Palaina pupa (possibly extinct)
- Palaina rubella
- Palaina striolata
- Plectostoma charasense (possibly extinct)
- Plectostoma dindingensis (possibly extinct)
- Plectostoma retrovertens
- Plectostoma turriforme (possibly extinct)
- Pseudopalaina polymorpha

===== Viviparids =====
- Bellamya liberiana
- Bellamya mweruensis
- Bellamya pagodiformis
- Margarya monodi
- Margarya yangtsunghaiensis (possibly extinct)

===== Other Architaenioglossa species =====
- Gonatorhaphe lauensis
- Lanistes neritoides
- Notharinia sp. nov. 'Khoe La'
- Notharinia sp. nov. 'Khoe La & Ong'
- Pomacea ocanensis
- Renea bourguignatiana

==== Cycloneritimorpha ====
- Neritina tiassalensis (possibly extinct)
- Ogasawarana chichijimana
- Ogasawarana habei
- Ogasawarana metamorpha
- Ogasawarana rex
- Ogasawarana yoshiwarana
- Theodoxus altenai
- Theodoxus baeticus
- Theodoxus valentinus

==== Hygrophila ====
Species

- Acroloxus macedonicus
- Australian freshwater limpet (Ancylastrum cumingianus)
- Ancylus ashangiensis
- Gyraulus ioanis
- Gyraulus shasi
- Lantzia carinata
- Lymnaea arachleica
- Wicker ancylid (Rhodacmea filosa)
- Segmentorbis excavatus
- Fat-whorled pondsnail (Stagnicola bonnevillensis)
- Thickshell pondsnail (Stagnicola utahensis) (possibly extinct)
- Tropinauta sinusdulcensis

Subspecies

- Bulinus tropicus torensis

==== Neogastropoda ====
- Conus lugubris
- Conus mordeirae
- Conus salreiensis

==== Other gastropod species ====
- Cincinna kizakikoensis
- Black abalone (Haliotis cracherodii)
- Siphonaria compressa

=== Bivalvia ===
There are 69 species and five subspecies in the class Bivalvia assessed as critically endangered.

==== Unionida ====
There are 66 species and five subspecies in the order Unionoida assessed as critically endangered.

===== Margaritiferids =====
Species

- Spengler's freshwater mussel (Margaritifera auricularia)
- Louisiana pearlshell (Margaritifera hembeli)
- Margaritifera marocana

Subspecies

- Margaritifera margaritifera durrovensis

===== Etheriids =====
- Acostaea rivolii

===== Unionids =====
Species

- Appalachian elktoe (Alasmidonta raveneliana)
- Fat threeridge (Amblema neislerii)
- Amphinaias couchiana
- Anodonta lucasi
- Anodonta pallaryi
- Cuneopsis demangei (possibly extinct)
- Fanshell (Cyprogenia stegaria)
- Dromedary naiad (Dromus dromas)
- Recovery pearly mussel (Elliptio nigella)
- Tar River spiny mussel (Elliptio steinstansana)
- Cumberlandian combshell (Epioblasma brevidens)
- Upland combshell (Epioblasma metastriata)
- Southern acorn riffle shell (Epioblasma othcaloogensis) (possibly extinct)
- Penitent mussel (Epioblasma penita)
- Tubercled blossom (Epioblasma torulosa)
- Shiny pigtoe (Fusconaia cor)
- False spike (Fusconaia mitchelli)
- Cracking pearlymussel (Hemistena lata)
- Lamprotula crassa (possibly extinct)
- Lamprotula liedtkei (possibly extinct)
- Lamprotula nodulosa (possibly extinct)
- Lamprotula triclava
- Speckled pocketbook (Lampsilis streckeri)
- Alabama lamp naiad (Lampsilis virescens)
- Lanceolaria bilirata
- Carolina heelsplitter (Lasmigona decorata)
- Leguminaia saulcyi
- Birdwing pearlymussel (Lemiox rimosus)
- Lexingtonia subplana
- Gulf moccasinshell (Medionidus penicillatus)
- Ochlockonee moccasinshell (Medionidus simpsonianus)
- Suwannee moccasinshell (Medionidus walkeri)
- Haddleton lampmussel (Obovaria haddletoni) (possibly extinct)
- Golf stick pearly mussel (Obovaria retusa)
- Little winged pearly mussel (Pegias fabula)
- Physunio ferrugineus
- White warty-back pearly mussel (Plethobasus cicatricosus)
- Orange-footed pimpleback mussel (Plethobasus cooperianus)
- Painted clubshell (Pleurobema chattanoogaense)
- Club naiad (Pleurobema clava)
- James River spinymussel (Pleurobema collina)
- Black clubshell (Pleurobema curtum) (possibly extinct)
- Dark pigtoe (Pleurobema furvum)
- Southern pigtoe (Pleurobema georgianum)
- Cumberland pigtoe (Pleurobema gibberum)
- Georgia pigtoe (Pleurobema hanleyianum)
- Flat pigtoe (Pleurobema marshalli)
- Rough pigtoe pearly mussel (Pleurobema plenum)
- Warrior pigtoe (Pleurobema rubellum)
- Popenaias popeii
- Southern kidneyshell (Ptychobranchus jonesi)
- Winged mapleleaf (Quadrula fragosa)
- Rhombuniopsis tauriformis
- Theliderma intermedia
- Appalachian monkeyface (Theliderma sparsa)
- Stirrupshell (Theliderma stapes)
- Theliderma tuberosa
- Pale lilliput naiad (Toxolasma cylindrellus)
- Unio foucauldianus
- Purple bean (Villosa perpurpurea)
- Cumberland bean pearly mussel (Villosa trabalis)

Subspecies

- Curtis' naiad (Epioblasma florentina curtisi)
- Brown-blossom naiad (Epioblasma florentina walkeri)
- White catspaw (Epioblasma obliquata perobliqua)
- Northern riffleshell (Epioblasma torulosa rangiana)

===== Hyriids =====
- Glenelg freshwater mussel (Hyridella glenelgensis)

==== Venerida ====
- Dreissena caspia (possibly extinct)
- Eupera crassa
- Pisidium ethiopicum

==== Sphaeriida ====
- Euglesa maasseni

=== Cephalopods ===
- Roughy umbrella octopus (Opisthoteuthis chathamensis)

== Cnidaria ==
=== Anthozoa ===
- Staghorn coral (Acropora cervicornis)
- Acropora japonica
- Elkhorn coral (Acropora palmata)
- Low-relief lettuce coral (Agaricia humilis)
- Lamarck's sheet coral (Agaricia lamarcki)
- Thin leaf lettuce coral (Agaricia tenuifolia)
- Alveopora japonica
- Colpophyllia breviserialis
- Chagos brain coral (Ctenella chagius)
- Pillar coral (Dendrogyra cylindrus)
- Grooved brain coral (Diploria labyrinthiformis)
- Ivell’s sea anemone (Edwardsia ivelli) (possibly extinct)
- Smooth flower coral (Eusmilia fastigiata)
- Sunray lettuce coral (Helioseris cucullata)
- Ten-ray star coral (Madracis decactis)
- Brazilian rose coral (Meandrina brasiliensis)
- Meandrina jacksoni
- Maze coral (Meandrina meandrites)
- Montipora patula
- Bahia brain coral (Mussismilia braziliensis)
- Mussismilia leptophylla
- Lowridge cactus coral (Mycetophyllia danaana)
- Rough cactus coral (Mycetophyllia ferox)
- Porites duerdeni
- Porites hadramauti
- Saffron coral (Porites sverdrupi)
- Symmetrical brain coral (Pseudodiploria strigosa)
- Wellington's solitary coral (Rhizopsammia wellingtoni) (possibly extinct)
- Artichoke coral (Scolymia cubensis)
- Atlantic mushroom coral (Scolymia lacera)
- Massive starlet coral (Siderastrea siderea)
- Floreana coral (Tubastraea floreana)

=== Hydrozoa ===
- Millepora braziliensis
- Blade fire coral (Millepora complanata)
- Millepora nitida
- Crustal fire coral (Millepora squarrosa)

== Arthropods ==

- Extinct in the wild (EW): 2 species
- Critically endangered (CR): 850 species
- Endangered (EN): 1,531 species
- Vulnerable (VU): 1,574 species
- Near threatened (NT, LR/cd): 1,118 species
- Least concern (LC): 8,632 species
- Data deficient (DD): 4,643 species
Arthropod species (IUCN, 2025-2)
- 18431 extant species have been evaluated
- 13788 of those are fully assessed (Note: excludes data deficient evaluations.)
- 9750 are not threatened at present
- 4223 to 8866 are threatened (Note: Threatened comprises CR, EN and VU. Upper estimate additionally includes DD.)
- 83 to 261 are extinct or extinct in the wild:
  - 81 extinct (EX) species (Note: Chart omits extinct (EX) species)
  - 2 extinct in the wild (EW)
  - 171 possibly extinct [CR(PE)]
  - 1 possibly extinct in the wild [CR(PEW)]

There are 394 arthropod species and three arthropod subspecies assessed as critically endangered.

=== Centipedes ===
- Ityphilus melanostigmus
- Mecistocephalus cyclops (possibly extinct)
- Mecistocephalus sechellarum (possibly extinct)

=== Seed shrimps ===
- Kapcypridopsis barnardi
- Spelaeoecia bermudensis

=== Arachnids ===
There are 47 arachnid species assessed as critically endangered.

==== Harvestmen ====
- Seychelles blind harvestman (Benoitinus elegans)
- Biantes parvulus (possibly extinct)
- Holozoster ovalis (possibly extinct)
- Ibalonius lomani (possibly extinct)
- Mitraceras crassipalpum (possibly extinct)
- Sitalcicus incertus (possibly extinct)

==== Spiders ====
- Anapistula ataecina
- Andasta siltte
- Apolania segmentata
- Ariadna ustulata
- Conothele truncicola
- Euso muehlenbergi (possibly extinct)
- Farqua quadrimaculata
- Gamasomorpha austera (possibly extinct)
- Hasarius mahensis
- Desertas wolf spider (Hogna ingens)
- Hybosida dauban
- Hybosida lucida
- Idioctis intertidalis (possibly extinct)
- Ischnothyrella jivani
- Lionneta gerlachi
- Kanthan cave trapdoor spider (Liphistius kanthan)
- Microdrassus inaudax
- Moneta coercervea (possibly extinct)
- Nesiergus gardineri (possibly extinct)
- Nesiergus halophilus (possibly extinct)
- Horrid ground-weaver (Nothophantes horridus)
- Opopaea probosciella
- Opopaea suspecta
- Orchestina maureen
- Paccius quadridentatus (possibly extinct)
- Napoleon jumping spider (Paraheliophanus napoleon)
- Patu silho
- Rameshwaram ornamental (Poecilotheria hanumavilasumica)
- Peacock tarantula (Poecilotheria metallica)
- Prodida stella
- Sesato setosa
- Seychellia lodoiceae (possibly extinct)
- Spermophorides lascars
- Steriphopus lacertosus (possibly extinct)
- Voraptus tenellus (possibly extinct)
- Zoma zoma

==== Other arachnid species ====
- Afrogarypus seychellesensis (possibly extinct)
- Silhouette giant mite (Dicrogonatus niger)
- Giant pseudoscorpion (Garypus titanius)
- Seychelles forest scorpion (Lychas braueri)
- Mahezomus apicoporus
- Saaristo's giant mite (Michaelothyrus seychellensis)

=== Branchiopoda ===
- Branchinecta belki
- Branchinecta mexicana
- Stone mountain fairy shrimp (Branchinella lithaca)
- Streptocephalus gracilis
- Streptocephalus moorei

=== Millipedes ===
- Diglossosternoides curiosus (possibly extinct)
- Major black millipede (Doratogonus major)
- Eostemmiulus caecus
- Eucarlia mauriesi
- Rhinotus albifrons (possibly extinct)
- Sechelleptus unilineatus
- Spirobolellus simplex (possibly extinct)

=== Entognatha ===
- Ceratophysella sp. nov. 'HC' (possibly extinct)
- Delamarephorura tami (possibly extinct)

=== Maxillopoda ===
Includes barnacles, copepods and a number of related animals.

- Antrisocopia prehensilis
- Erebonectes nesioticus
- Nanocopia minuta
- Paracyclopia naessi
- Speleoithona bermudensis
- Speleophria bivexilla
- Speleophria scottodicarloi

=== Malacostracans ===
Malacostraca includes crabs, lobsters, crayfish, shrimp, krill, woodlice, and many others. There are 125 malacostracan species and one malacostracan subspecies assessed as critically endangered.

==== Mysida ====
- Bermudamysis speluncola
- Sterrer's cave mysid (Platyops sterreri)

==== Mictaceans ====
- Mictocaris halope

==== Isopods ====
- Atlantasellus cavernicolus
- Bermudalana aruboides
- Curassanthura bermudensis
- Spiky yellow woodlouse (Pseudolaureola atlantica)
- Thermosphaeroma cavicauda
- Thermosphaeroma dugesi
- Thermosphaeroma macrura
- Thermosphaeroma smithi

==== Amphipods ====
- Aquadulcaris pheronyx
- Dandenong freshwater amphipod (Austrogammarus australis)
- Bogidiella bermudensis
- Cocoharpinia iliffei
- Noel's amphipod (Gammarus desperatus)
- Idunella sketi
- Ingolfiella longipes
- Pseudoniphargus grandimanus

==== Decapods ====
There are 106 decapod species and one decapod subspecies assessed as critically endangered.

===== Parastacids =====
- Cherax leckii
- Hairy marron (Cherax tenuimanus)
- Central North burrowing crayfish (Engaeus granulatus)
- Mallacoota burrowing crayfish (Engaeus mallacoota)
- Scottsdale burrowing crayfish (Engaeus spinicaudatus)
- Warragul burrowing crayfish (Engaeus sternalis)
- Margaret river burrowing crayfish (Engaewa pseudoreducta)
- Euastacus bindal
- Euastacus dalagarbe
- Fitzroy falls crayfish (Euastacus dharawalus)
- Euastacus eungella
- Euastacus gamilaroi
- Euastacus girurmulayn
- Euastacus guruhgi
- Euastacus guwinus
- Euastacus jagabar
- Euastacus jagara
- Euastacus maidae
- Ochre-bellied crayfish (Euastacus mirangudjin)
- Euastacus monteithorum
- Euastacus robertsi
- Euastacus setosus
- Euastacus yigara
- Ombrastacoides denisoni
- Ombrastacoides parvicaudatus

===== Gecarcinucids =====
- Ceylonthelphusa callista
- Ceylonthelphusa durrelli
- Ceylonthelphusa kotagama
- Ceylonthelphusa nana
- Ceylonthelphusa nata
- Ceylonthelphusa orthos
- Ceylonthelphusa sanguinea
- Ceylonthelphusa savitriae
- Clinothelphusa kakoota
- Mahatha helaya
- Mahatha iora
- Mahatha lacuna
- Mahatha regina
- Oziotelphusa intuta
- Oziotelphusa kodagoda
- Swamp forest crab (Parathelphusa reticulata)
- Perbrinckia cracens
- Perbrinckia enodis
- Perbrinckia fido
- Perbrinckia gabadagei (possibly extinct)
- Perbrinckia glabra
- Perbrinckia morayensis
- Perbrinckia punctata
- Perbrinckia quadratus
- Perbrinckia rosae
- Perbrinckia scitula
- Phricotelphusa hockpingi

===== Atyids =====
- Atya brachyrhinus (possibly extinct)
- Caridina apodosis (possibly extinct)
- Caridina linduensis
- Caridina subventralis
- Caridina tumida
- Caridina yilong (possibly extinct)
- Edoneus atheatus
- Lancaris kumariae
- Paratya norfolkensis
- Sinodina acutipoda (possibly extinct)
- Typhlatya iliffei

===== Cambarids =====
Species

- Cambarellus areolatus (possibly extinct)
- Cambarellus prolixus
- Benton County cave crayfish (Cambarus aculabrum)
- Lacon exit cave crayfish (Cambarus laconensis)
- Obey crayfish (Cambarus obeyensis)
- Delaware County cave crayfish (Cambarus subterraneus)
- Oklahoma cave crayfish (Cambarus tartarus)
- White spring cave crayfish (Cambarus veitchorum) (possibly extinct)
- Hell creek cave crayfish (Cambarus zophonastes)
- Hatchie burrowing crayfish (Fallicambarus hortoni)
- Shelta cave crayfish (Orconectes sheltae)
- Silver Glen springs cave crayfish (Procambarus attiguus)
- Procambarus catemacoensis
- Big-cheeked cave crayfish (Procambarus delicatus) (possibly extinct)
- Caddo chimney crayfish (Procambarus machardyi)
- Putnam County cave crayfish (Procambarus morrisi)
- Procambarus ortmannii
- Procambarus paradoxus (possibly extinct)
- Procambarus regiomontanus

Subspecies

- Procambarus rogersi expletus

===== Palaemonids =====
- Cryphiops brasiliensis
- Cryphiops luscus (possibly extinct)
- Leptopalaemon glabrus
- Macrobrachium denticulatum (possibly extinct)
- Macrobrachium oxyphilus (possibly extinct)
- Macrobrachium purpureamanus (possibly extinct)
- Macrobrachium scorteccii (possibly extinct)
- Florida cave shrimp (Palaemonetes cummingi) (possibly extinct)
- Palaemonetes lindsayi
- Palaemonetes mesopotamicus
- Palaemonetes mexicanus

===== Other decapod species =====
- Barbouria cubensis
- Orchid Island crab (Geothelphusa lanyu)
- Green crab (Geothelphusa lutao)
- Singapore freshwater crab (Johora singaporensis)
- Karstama balicum
- Karstama emdi
- Grandbassa river crab (Liberonautes grandbassa)
- Lugbe river crab (Liberonautes lugbe)
- Placid crayfish (Pacifastacus fortis)
- Procaris chacei
- Somersiella sterreri
- Strengeriana antioquensis (possibly extinct)
- Tehuana veracruzana (possibly extinct)

=== Insects ===

- Extinct in the wild (EW): 1 species
- Critically endangered (CR): 520 species
- Endangered (EN): 1,132 species
- Vulnerable (VU): 1,082 species
- Near threatened (NT, LR/cd): 897 species
- Least concern (LC): 6,802 species
- Data deficient (DD): 3,255 species
Insect species (IUCN, 2025-2)
- 13,696 extant species have been evaluated
- 10,441 of those are fully assessed (Note: excludes data deficient evaluations.)
- 7,699 are not threatened at present
- 2,742 to 5,997 are threatened (Note: Threatened comprises CR, EN and VU. Upper estimate additionally includes DD.)
- 59 to 175 are extinct or extinct in the wild:
  - 58 extinct (EX) species (Note: Chart omits extinct (EX) species)
  - 1 extinct in the wild (EW)
  - 116 possibly extinct [CR(PE)]
  - 0 possibly extinct in the wild [CR(PEW)]

There are 195 insect species and two insect subspecies assessed as critically endangered.

==== Blattodea ====
- Balta crassivenosa (possibly extinct)
- Desroches cockroach (Delosia ornata)
- Holocompsa pusilla (possibly extinct)
- Hololeptoblatta pandanicola
- Sliferia similis (possibly extinct)
- Theganopteryx grisea (possibly extinct)
- Theganopteryx liturata (possibly extinct)
- Theganopteryx scotti (possibly extinct)

==== Orthoptera ====
There are 72 species in the order Orthoptera assessed as critically endangered.

===== Euschmidtiids =====
- Morogoro monkey grasshopper (Chromomastax movogovodia) (possibly extinct)
- Mlingano monkey grasshopper (Euschmidtia bidens) (possibly extinct)
- Burtt's monkey grasshopper (Euschmidtia burtti) (possibly extinct)
- Dirsh's monkey grasshopper (Euschmidtia dirshi) (possibly extinct)
- Phipps' monkey grasshopper (Euschmidtia phippsi) (possibly extinct)
- Usambara monkey grasshopper (Euschmidtia uvarovi)
- Dar-es-salaam monkey grasshopper (Euschmidtia viridifasciata) (possibly extinct)

===== Crickets =====
- Gryllapterus tomentosus
- Metioche payendeei
- Metioche superbus
- Mahé boulder cricket (Phalangacris alluaudi)
- Seychellesia nitidula

===== Acridids =====
- Zanzibar giant forest grasshopper (Allaga ambigua) (possibly extinct)
- Usambara splendid grasshopper (Anischnansis burtti) (possibly extinct)
- Uluguru forest grasshopper (Burttia sylvatica)
- Adana grasshopper (Chorthippus antecessor)
- Bozdagh grasshopper (Chorthippus bozdaghi)
- Ilgaz mountain grasshopper (Chorthippus ilkazi)
- Epirus dancing grasshopper (Chorthippus lacustris)
- Uluguru mountain grasshopper (Cyphocerastis uluguruensis)
- Maspalomas bow-legged grasshopper (Dericorys minutus) (possibly extinct)
- Kilosa noble grasshopper (Eupropacris abbreviata) (possibly extinct)
- Gastrimargus immaculatus
- Myrmeleotettix ethicus
- Triandafilia mountain grasshopper (Oropodisma lagrecai)
- Willemse's mountain grasshopper (Oropodisma willemsei)
- East Usambara speckled grasshopper (Physocrobylus tessa)
- Schayera baiulus

===== Tettigoniids =====
- Mount Coke false shieldback (Acilacris furcatus)
- Kristin's false shieldback (Acilacris kristinae)
- Santa Monica shieldback katydid (Aglaothorax longipennis)
- Black-spotted false shieldback (Aroegas nigroornatus)
- Pondo flat-necked shieldback (Arytropteris pondo)
- Fer's marbled bush-cricket (Eupholidoptera feri)
- Gran Canaria bush-cricket (Evergoderes cabrerai) (possibly extinct)
- Hemisaga elongata
- Middlekauf's shieldback katydid (Idiostatus middlekaufi)
- Ixalodectes flectocercus
- Nanodectes bulbicercus
- Pachysaga strobila
- Imperiled grass false shieldback (Paracilacris periclitatus)
- Paradecolya briseferi
- Giona Greek bush-cricket (Parnassiana gionica)
- Menalon Greek bush-cricket (Parnassiana menalon)
- Akarnanika Greek bush-cricket (Parnassiana nigromarginata)
- Panaitoliko Greek bush-cricket (Parnassiana panaetolikon)
- Parnassos Greek bush-cricket (Parnassiana parnassica)
- Zulu ambush katydid (Peringueyella zulu) (possibly extinct)
- Cyprian grey bush-cricket (Platycleis kibris)
- Calbali bush-cricket (Psorodonotus ebneri)
- Three-lobed bush-cricket (Rhacocleis trilobata) (possibly extinct)
- Rodriguesiophisis spinifera
- Sardinian grey bush-cricket (Sardoplatycleis galvagnii)
- Arboreal seedpod shieldback (Thoracistus arboreus)
- Peringuey's seedpod shieldback (Thoracistus peringueyi) (possibly extinct)
- Transkei shieldback (Transkeidectes multidentis)

===== Other Orthoptera species =====
- Morogoro pretty grasshopper (Acanthothericles bicoloripes) (possibly extinct)
- Palma stick grasshopper (Acrostira euphorbiae)
- Tenerife stick grasshopper (Acrostira tenerifae)
- Arachnocephalus medvedevi
- Castleton's flightless katydid (Austrodontura castletoni)
- Cave katydid (Cedarbergeniana imperfecta)
- Mpwapwa silent grasshopper (Chromousambilla burtti) (possibly extinct)
- Seychelles crested groundhopper (Coptottigia cristata)
- Duplessis' agile katydid (Griffiniana duplessisae)
- Crau plain grasshopper (Prionotropis rhodanica)
- Seychelles shortwinged groundhopper (Procytettix fusiformis) (possibly extinct)
- Marais' lace-winged katydid (Pseudosaga maraisi)
- Pyrgacris descampsi
- Pyrgacris relictus
- Torreya pygmy grasshopper (Tettigidea empedonepia)
- San Torini cave-cricket (Troglophilus marinae)

==== Hymenoptera ====
- Adetomyrma venatrix
- Ammobates dusmeti
- Andrena labiatula (possibly extinct)
- Sri Lankan relict ant (Aneuretus simoni)
- Rusty patched bumble bee (Bombus affinis)
- Franklin's bumblebee (Bombus franklini)
- Bombus rubriventris (possibly extinct)
- Suckley cuckoo bumble bee (Bombus suckleyi)
- Variable cuckoo bumblebee (Bombus variabilis)
- Megachile cypricola (possibly extinct)
- Nomada siciliensis (possibly extinct)
- Dawn ant (Nothomyrmecia macrops)

==== Lepidoptera ====
Moths and butterflies

- Marion's plume moth (Agdistis marionae)
- Sri Lankan rose (Atrophaneura jophon)
- Cotrell's daisy copper (Chrysoritis cotrelli)
- Prairie sphinx moth (Euproserpinus wiesti)
- Natterer's Longwing (Heliconius nattereri)
- Lepidochrysops lotana
- David's tiger (Parantica davidi)
- Pieris wollastoni (possibly extinct)
- Bolland's blue (Polyommatus bollandi)
- Macedonian grayling (Pseudochazara cingovskii)
- Sinai baton blue (Pseudophilotes sinaicus)

==== Beetles ====
- Coral pink sand dunes tiger beetle (Cicindela albissima)
- Colophon berrisfordi
- Colophon cassoni
- Colophon montisatris
- Colophon primosi
- Delta green ground beetle (Elaphrus viridis)
- Glaphyra bassettii
- Canterbury knobbled weevil (Hadramphus tuberculatus)
- Edith's fungus weevil (Homoeodera edithia)
- Click beetle-like fungus weevil (Homoeodera elateroides)
- Greater fungus weevil (Homoeodera major)
- Bark beetle-like fungus weevil (Homoeodera scolytoides)
- Hydrotarsus compunctus
- Meladema imbricata
- American burying beetle (Nicrophorus americanus)
- Cromwell chafer beetle (Prodontria lewisi)
- Propomacrus cypriacus
- Thorectes coloni

==== Odonata ====
Includes dragonflies and damselflies.

Species

- Acanthagrion taxaense
- Allocnemis maccleeryi
- Amanipodagrion gilliesi
- Anisogomphus solitaris (possibly extinct)
- Sydney hawk (Austrocordulia leonardi)
- Boninagrion ezoin
- Boninthemis insularis
- Togo red jewel (Chlorocypha jejuna) (possibly extinct)
- Coenagriocnemis insularis
- Cryptophaea saukra
- Disparoneura ramajana (possibly extinct)
- Drepanosticta adami (possibly extinct)
- Drepanosticta austeni (possibly extinct)
- Merry shadowdamsel (Drepanosticta hilaris)
- Drepanosticta montana (possibly extinct)
- Drepanosticta submontana (possibly extinct)
- Echo maxima
- Smoky-winged threadtail (Elattoneura leucostigma)
- Elattoneura pluotae
- Elga newtonsantosi
- Enallagma maldivensis (possibly extinct)
- Erythrodiplax acantha
- Erythrodiplax nivea
- Sri Lanka grappletail (Heliogomphus ceylonicus)
- Heliogomphus lyratus (possibly extinct)
- Heliogomphus nietneri (possibly extinct)
- Heteragrion peregrinum (possibly extinct)
- Indolestes boninensis
- Libellula angelina
- Macromia flinti (possibly extinct)
- Atlantic helicopter (Mecistogaster pronoti)
- Crimson Hawaiian damselfly (Megalagrion leptodemas)
- Molokai damselfly (Megalagrion molokaiense) (possibly extinct)
- Flying earwig Hawaiian damselfly (Megalagrion nesiotes)
- Metaleptobasis gibbosa (possibly extinct)
- Micrathyria kleerekoperi
- Micromacromia miraculosa
- Minagrion ribeiroi
- Bizarre junglewatcher (Neodythemis takamandensis)
- Nesolestes nigeriensis
- Onychogomphus boudoti
- Mulanje damsel (Oreocnemis phoenix)
- Elusive skimmer (Orthetrum rubens) (possibly extinct)
- Palaemnema croceicauda
- Palaemnema edmondi (possibly extinct)
- Gambles's relic (Pentaphlebia gamblesi)
- Perissolestes remus (possibly extinct)
- Kenya jewel (Platycypha amboniensis)
- Proischnura polychromatica
- Proplatycnemis pembipes
- Protosticta gracilis
- Protosticta plicata
- Protosticta rozendalorum
- Pseudagrion mascagnii
- Greek red damsel (Pyrrhosoma elisabethae)
- Rhinocypha ogasawarensis
- Risiocnemis seidenschwarzi
- Emerald Sri Lanka spreadwing (Sinhalestes orientalis)
- Sympetrum evanescens
- Principe dropwing (Trithemis nigra)
- Streamertail (Zygonychidium gracile)

Subspecies

- Chlorogomphus brunneus keramensis
- Delphi cordulegaster (Cordulegaster helladica kastalia)

==== Other insect species ====
- Vesk's plant-louse (Acizzia veski)
- Antisolabis seychellensis
- Scott's stick insect (Carausius scotti)
- Chaetolabia fryeri
- Chaetospania gardineri
- Lord Howe Island stick insect (Dryococelus australis)
- Glyptotermes scotti
- Pygmy hog-sucking louse (Haematopinus oliveri)
- Procryptotermes fryeri
- Banksia montana mealybug (Pseudococcus markharveyi)
- Mount Donna Buang wingless stonefly (Riekoperla darlingtoni)
- Barrett's plant-louse (Trioza barrettae)

== See also ==
- Lists of IUCN Red List critically endangered species
- List of least concern invertebrates
- List of near threatened invertebrates
- List of vulnerable invertebrates
- List of endangered invertebrates
- List of recently extinct invertebrates
- List of data deficient invertebrates
