= List of critically endangered molluscs =

- Extinct in the wild (EW): 12 species
- Critically endangered (CR): 785 species
- Endangered (EN): 708 species
- Vulnerable (VU): 1,123 species
- Near threatened (NT, LR/cd): 823 species
- Least concern (LC): 3,526 species
- Data deficient (DD): 2,229 species
Mollusc species (IUCN, 2025.2)
- 9,502 extant species have been evaluated
- 7,273 of those are fully assessed (Note: excludes data deficient evaluations.)
- 4,358 are not threatened at present
- 2,915 to 5,144 are threatened (Note: Threatened comprises CR, EN and VU. Upper estimate additionally includes DD.)
- 308 to 476 are extinct or extinct in the wild:
  - 296 extinct (EX) species (Note: Chart omits extinct (EX) species)
  - 12 extinct in the wild (EW)
  - 167 possibly extinct [CR(PE)]
  - 1 possibly extinct in the wild [CR(PEW)]

Critically endangered (CR) species face an extremely high risk of extinction in the wild.

As of September 2016, the International Union for Conservation of Nature (IUCN) listed 581 critically endangered mollusc species, including 117 which are tagged as possibly extinct. Of all evaluated mollusc species, 8.0% are listed as critically endangered. The IUCN also lists 11 mollusc subspecies as critically endangered.

No subpopulations of molluscs have been evaluated by the IUCN.

Additionally 1988 mollusc species (27% of those evaluated) are listed as data deficient, meaning there is insufficient information for a full assessment of conservation status. As these species typically have small distributions and/or populations, they are intrinsically likely to be threatened, according to the IUCN. While the category of data deficient indicates that no assessment of extinction risk has been made for the taxa, the IUCN notes that it may be appropriate to give them "the same degree of attention as threatened taxa, at least until their status can be assessed".

This is a complete list of critically endangered mollusc species and subspecies evaluated by the IUCN. Species considered possibly extinct by the IUCN are marked as such.

== Gastropods ==
There are 511 species and six subspecies of gastropod assessed as critically endangered.

=== Stylommatophora ===
Stylommatophora includes the majority of land snails and slugs. There are 233 species and five subspecies in the order Stylommatophora assessed as critically endangered.

==== Amastrids ====
- Amastra cylindrica
- Amastra micans
- Amastra rubens
- Amastra spirizona
- Armsia petasus
- Laminella sanguinea
- Tropidoptera heliciformis

==== Partulids ====
- Eua globosa (possibly extinct)
- Partula affinis
- Partula calypso
- Partula clara
- Partula emersoni
- Fat Guam partula (Partula gibba)
- Partula guamensis (possibly extinct)
- Partula langfordi
- Partula leucothoe (possibly extinct)
- Partula martensiana
- Partula milleri (possibly extinct)
- Partula otaheitana
- Radiolate partula (Partula radiolata)
- Partula subgonochila
- Moorean viviparious tree snail (Partula taeniata)
- Short Samoan tree snail (Samoana abbreviata)
- Samoana attenuata
- Samoana bellula
- Samoana burchi
- Samoana cramptoni (possibly extinct)
- Samoana decussatula
- Samoana dryas
- Samoana fragilis
- Samoana hamadryas
- Samoana meyeri
- Samoana oreas
- Samoana strigata

==== Achatinellids ====
- Achatinella apexfulva
- Achatinella bellula
- Achatinella bulimoides
- Achatinella byronii
- Achatinella cestus
- Achatinella concavospira
- Achatinella curta
- Achatinella decipiens
- Achatinella fulgens
- Achatinella fuscobasis
- Achatinella leucorrhaphe
- Achatinella lila
- Achatinella lorata
- Achatinella mustelina
- Achatinella phaeozona
- Achatinella pulcherrima
- Achatinella pupukanioe
- Achatinella sowerbyana
- Achatinella stewartii
- Achatinella swiftii
- Achatinella taeniolata
- Achatinella turgida
- Achatinella viridans
- Achatinella vulpina
- Gulickia alexandri
- Partulina confusa
- Partulina dubia

==== Endodontids ====
Species

- Aaadonta angaurana (possibly extinct)
- Aaadonta irregularis
- Aaadonta kinlochi (possibly extinct)
- Aaadonta pelewana (possibly extinct)
- Cookeconcha contorta
- Endodonta apiculata (possibly extinct)
- Priceconcha tuvuthaensis
- Thaumatodon corrugata
- Thaumatodon spirrhymatum

Subspecies

- Aaadonta constricta babelthuapi
- Aaadonta constricta constricta
- Aaadonta constricta komakanensis
- Aaadonta fuscozonata depressa
- Aaadonta fuscozonata fuscozonata

==== Charopids ====
- Charopa lafargei
- Ammonite snail (Helenoconcha relicta)
- Kondoconcha othnius
- Lauopa mbalavuana (possibly extinct)
- Maafu thaumasius
- Mautodontha boraborensis
- Mautodontha ceuthma
- Opanara altiapica
- Opanara areaensis
- Opanara bitridentata
- Opanara caliculata
- Opanara depasoapicata
- Opanara duplicidentata
- Opanara fosbergi
- Opanara megomphala
- Opanara perahuensis
- Orangia maituatensis
- Palline notera
- Radioconus goeldi
- Rhysoconcha variumbilicata
- Ruatara koarana
- Semperdon kororensis
- Semperdon xyleborus
- Sinployea angularis
- Sinployea navutuenis
- Dlinza Forest pinwheel (Trachycystis clifdeni)
- Trachycystis placenta
- Vatusila kondoi
- Vatusila nayauana

==== Helicarionids ====
- Coneuplecta turrita (possibly extinct)
- Erepta stylodon
- Harmogenanina implicata
- Sesara sp. 'Bai Voi'
- Zingis radiolata (possibly extinct)

==== Orthalicids ====
- Bulimulus achatellinus (possibly extinct)
- Bulimulus adelphus (possibly extinct)
- Bulimulus adserseni
- Bulimulus chemitzioides
- Bulimulus curtus
- Bulimulus deridderi (possibly extinct)
- Bulimulus duncanus (possibly extinct)
- Bulimulus eos (possibly extinct)
- Bulimulus eschariferus
- Bulimulus galapaganus
- Bulimulus habeli
- Bulimulus hirsutus
- Bulimulus indefatigabilis
- Bulimulus jacobi
- Bulimulus lycodus (possibly extinct)
- Bulimulus ochsneri
- Bulimulus reibischi
- Bulimulus saeronius (possibly extinct)
- Bulimulus sculpturatus
- Bulimulus sp. 'josevillani' (possibly extinct)
- Bulimulus sp. 'krameri' (possibly extinct)
- Bulimulus sp. 'nilsodhneri' (possibly extinct)
- Bulimulus sp. 'tuideroyi' (possibly extinct)
- Bulimulus sp. 'vanmoli' (possibly extinct)
- Bulimulus tanneri (possibly extinct)
- Bulimulus wolfi
- Leuchocharis pancheri
- Lord Howe flax snail (Placostylus bivaricosus)
- Placostylus koroensis (possibly extinct)
- Placostylus mbengensis

==== Rhytidids ====
- Delos gardineri (possibly extinct)
- Pondoland cannibal snail (Natalina beyrichi)
- Ouagapia ratusukuni
- Rhytida clarki
- Rhytida oconnori

==== Streptaxids ====
- Conturbatia crenata (possibly extinct)
- Glabrennea silhouettensis
- Glabrennea thomasseti
- Gonospira duponti
- Gulella puzeyi
- Gulella salpinx
- Priodiscus spinosus

==== Lauriids ====
- Leiostyla abbreviata (possibly extinct)
- Leiostyla cassida (possibly extinct)
- Leiostyla cassidula
- Leiostyla gibba (possibly extinct)
- Leiostyla simulator (possibly extinct)

==== Helicids ====
- Assyriella rechingeri
- Chilostoma crombezi
- Chilostoma harpya
- Hemicycla efferata
- Hemicycla mascaensis
- Hemicycla modesta (possibly extinct)
- Hemicycla paeteliana
- Hemicycla plicaria
- Hemicycla saulcyi
- Idiomela subplicata
- Tacheocampylaea romagnolii
- Theba arinagae
- Corsican snail (Tyrrhenaria ceratina)
- Tyrrheniberus sardonius

==== Hygromiids ====
- Actinella arridens
- Actinella obserata
- Canariella jandiaensis
- Canariella ronceroi
- Caseolus subcalliferus
- Cernuella amanda
- Cernuella aradasii
- Discula bulverii
- Discula lyelliana (possibly extinct)
- Discula tabellata
- Discula testudinalis
- Discula tetrica (possibly extinct)
- Geomitra delphinuloides (possibly extinct)
- Geomitra grabhami (possibly extinct)
- Ichnusomunda sacchii
- Lemniscia galeata
- Leptaxis vetusa
- Montserratina becasis (possibly extinct)
- Pyrenaearia molae
- Trochoidea pseudojacosta
- Xerosecta giustii

==== Enids ====
- Euchondrus ramonensis
- Napaeus exilis
- Napaeus isletae
- Napaeus osoriensis
- Napaeus teobaldoi
- Pene galilaea

==== Other Stylommatophora species ====
- Atlantica guerinianus
- Bertia cambojiensis
- Cecilioides eulima
- Cecilioides jeskalovicensis
- Cerion nanus
- Draparnaudia anniae
- Draparnaudia subnecata
- Dupontia levensonia
- Gonyostomus gonyostomus
- Gyliotrachela luctans
- Helicostyla smargadina
- Banded dune snail (Helminthoglypta walkeriana)
- Hirinaba curytibana
- Hypselostoma elephas
- Magazine Mountain middle-toothed snail (Inflectarius magazinensis)
- Lampedusa melitensis
- Megalobulimus grandis
- Megalobulimus proclivis
- Fraternal snail (Micrarionta feralis)
- Monilearia arguineguinensis
- Monilearia granostriata
- Monilearia pulverulenta (possibly extinct)
- Monilearia tumulorum
- Orcula fuchsi
- Oxyloma kanabense
- Pachnodus oxoniensis
- Paraboysidia serpa
- Plutonia angulosa
- Plutonia falcifera
- Plutonia machadoi
- Plutonia reticulata
- Catalina mountain snail (Radiocentrum avalonense)
- Succinea rotumana (possibly extinct)
- Trochochlamys ogasawarana
- Trochomorpha kambarae
- Trochomorpha moalensis
- Trochomorpha planoconus
- Trochomorpha tuvuthae
- Videna pagodula
- Videna pumila
- Zilchogyra paulistana

=== Littorinimorpha ===
There are 181 species in the order Littorinimorpha assessed as critically endangered.

==== Hydrobiids ====
- Alzoniella galaica (possibly extinct)
- Alzoniella iberopyrenaica
- Alzoniella marianae
- Alzoniella onatensis
- Attebania bernasconii
- Beddomeia tumida (possibly extinct)
- Belgrandia alcoaensis
- Belgrandia bonelliana
- Belgrandia moitessieri (possibly extinct)
- Belgrandia varica (possibly extinct)
- Belgrandiella austriana
- Belgrandiella bachkovoensis
- Belgrandiella boetersi (possibly extinct)
- Belgrandiella cavernica (possibly extinct)
- Belgrandiella ganslmayri
- Belgrandiella kreisslorum (possibly extinct)
- Belgrandiella mimula
- Belgrandiella multiformis (possibly extinct)
- Belgrandiella parreyssii
- Belgrandiella pelerei
- Belgrandiella styriaca
- Bythinella cylindrica
- Bythinella eutrepha (possibly extinct)
- Bythinella gloeeri
- Bythinella lunzensis
- Bythinella markovi
- Bythinella turca
- Bythiospeum cisterciensorum
- Bythiospeum dubium (possibly extinct)
- Bythiospeum gonostoma (possibly extinct)
- Bythiospeum husmanni
- Bythiospeum pellucidum
- Bythiospeum pfeifferi
- Bythiospeum putei (possibly extinct)
- Bythiospeum tschapecki
- Bythiospeum turritum (possibly extinct)
- Bythiospeum wiaaiglica
- Caledoconcha carnosa
- Coahuilix de hubbs snail (Coahuilix hubbsi)
- Costellina turrita
- Dalmatella sketi
- Daphniola louisi
- Delavaya dianchiensis
- Dianella schlickumi (possibly extinct)
- Dianella thiesseana
- Falsipyrgula beysehirana (possibly extinct)
- Fluvidona petterdi
- Giustia costata
- Giustia mellalensis
- Giustia saidai
- Gocea ohridana
- Graecoanatolica brevis (possibly extinct)
- Graecoanatolica conica (possibly extinct)
- Graecoanatolica vegorriticola
- Graecorientalia vrissiana
- Graziana adlitzensis
- Grossuana thracica
- Hadopyrgus ngataana
- Hadziella rudnicae
- Hauffenia edlingeri
- Hauffenia tovunica
- Heideella sp. 'valai'
- Hemistomia aquilonaris
- Hemistomia crosseana
- Hemistomia gorotitei
- Hemistomia lacinia
- Hemistomia neku
- Hemistomia shostakovichi
- Hemistomia whiteleggei
- Hemistomia xaracuu
- Hemistomia yalayu
- Horatia lucidulus
- Hydrobia anatolica (possibly extinct)
- Hydrobia rheophila
- Iglica gratulabunda (possibly extinct)
- Iglica soussensis
- Iglica velkovrhi
- Iglica wolfischeri
- Islamia anatolica
- Islamia bendidis (possibly extinct)
- Islamia bunarbasa
- Islamia graeca (possibly extinct)
- Islamia hadei (possibly extinct)
- Islamia pseudorientalica (possibly extinct)
- Islamia trichoniana
- Islamia zermanica (possibly extinct)
- Jardinella colmani
- Kerkia kusceri
- Kirelia carinata (possibly extinct)
- Kirelia murtici
- Kuschelita inflata
- Kuschelita mica
- Lanzaia skradinensis
- Leiorhagium granum
- Leiorhagium mussorgskyi
- Lyhnidia hadzii
- Lyhnidia karamani
- Lyhnidia stankovici
- Malaprespia albanica
- Beaverpond marstonia (Marstonia castor)
- Ozark pyrg (Marstonia ozarkensis) (possibly extinct)
- Marstoniopsis armoricana
- Marstoniopsis vrbasi
- Mercuria punica (possibly extinct)
- Mercuria sarahae
- Ohridohauffenia minuta (possibly extinct)
- Paladilhiopsis janinensis (possibly extinct)
- Paladilhiopsis neaaugustensis
- Parabythinella graeca
- Parabythinella malaprespensis
- Plagigeyeria montenigrina
- Plagigeyeria tribunicae
- Potamopyrgus acus (possibly extinct)
- Potamopyrgus oppidanus
- Prespolitorea malaprespensis
- Prespolitorea valvataeformis
- Pseudamnicola leprevieri
- Pseudamnicola pallaryi
- Pseudoislamia balcanica
- Pyrgohydrobia jablanicensis
- Bruneau hot springsnail (Pyrgulopsis bruneauensis)
- Ash Meadows pebblesnail (Pyrgulopsis erythropoma)
- Socorro springsnail (Pyrgulopsis neomexicana)
- New Mexico hotspring snail (Pyrgulopsis thermalis)
- Three Forks springsnail (Pyrgulopsis trivialis)
- Clear Lake pyrg (Pyrgulopsis ventricosa)
- Radomaniola elongata
- Radomaniola lacustris
- Sadleriana cavernosa
- Sardohoratia sulcata (possibly extinct)
- Zaton cave water snail (Saxurinator labiatus)
- Saxurinator orthodoxus
- Coosa pebblesnail (Somatogyrus coosaensis)
- Stocky pebblesnail (Somatogyrus crassus) (possibly extinct)
- Tennessee pebblesnail (Somatogyrus currierianus) (possibly extinct)
- Fluted pebblesnail (Somatogyrus hendersoni) (possibly extinct)
- Atlas pebblesnail (Somatogyrus humerosus) (possibly extinct)
- Dwarf pebblesnail (Somatogyrus nanus) (possibly extinct)
- Pygmy pebblesnail (Somatogyrus pygmaeus)
- Quadrate pebblesnail (Somatogyrus quadratus)
- Rolling pebblesnail (Somatogyrus strengi)
- Opaque pebblesnail (Somatogyrus tennesseensis)
- Stankovicia baicaliiformis
- Tanousia zrmanjae (possibly extinct)
- Tarraconia gasulli
- Trachyochridia filocincta
- Trichonia trichonica
- Vinodolia hadouphylax
- Vinodolia lacustris
- Vinodolia matjasici
- Zaumia kusceri
- Zaumia sanctizaumi (possibly extinct)

==== Cochliopids ====
- Heleobia dobrogica
- Heleobia tritonum
- Brune's tryonia (Tryonia brunei) (possibly extinct)

==== Bithyniids ====
- Bithynia kastorias
- Gabbia alticola
- Gabbiella candida
- Gabbiella depressa
- Gabbiella matadina (possibly extinct)
- Gabbiella neothaumaeformis
- Gabbiella parva
- Incertihydrobia teesdalei
- Jubaia aethiopica
- Pseudobithynia euboeensis
- Pseudobithynia falniowskii
- Pseudobithynia kathrinae
- Pseudobithynia panetolis
- Sierraia outambensis
- Soapitia dageti (possibly extinct)

==== Moitessieriids ====
- Henrigirardia wienini (possibly extinct)
- Spiralix corsica (possibly extinct)

==== Assimineids ====
- Kubaryia pilikia (possibly extinct)
- Omphalotropis ingens (possibly extinct)
- Pseudogibbula cara (possibly extinct)
- Pseudogibbula duponti
- Septariellina congolensis
- Valvatorbis mauritii (possibly extinct)

==== Pomatiopsids ====
- Tomichia cawstoni
- Tomichia natalensis
- Tomichia tristis

=== Sorbeoconcha ===
- Pleurocera ampla (Elimia ampla)
- Lily Shoals elimia (Elimia annettae)
- Princess elimia (Elimia bellacrenata)
- Mossy elimia (Elimia troostiana) (possibly extinct)
- Leptoxis melanoides
- Plicate rocksnail (Leptoxis plicata)
- Melanoides agglutinans (possibly extinct)
- Melanopsis ammonis
- Melanopsis brevicula
- Melanopsis chlorotica
- Melanopsis germaini (possibly extinct)
- Melanopsis infracincta (possibly extinct)
- Melanopsis khabourensis (possibly extinct)
- Melanopsis pachya (possibly extinct)
- Melanopsis parreyssii
- Melanopsis penchinati
- Melanopsis saharica
- Corpulent hornsnail (Pleurocera corpulenta)
- Potadoma kadeii
- Potadoma wansoni
- Pseudocleopatra dartevellei
- Tylomelania kruimeli

=== Architaenioglossa ===
There are 48 species in the order Architaenioglossa assessed as critically endangered.

==== Cyclophorids ====
- Alycaeus balingensis
- Boucardicus fidimananai
- Boucardicus fortistriatus
- Boucardicus simplex
- Madgeaconcha sevathiani (possibly extinct)

==== Diplommatinids ====
- Arinia boreoborneensis
- Arinia dentifera
- Arinia oviformis
- Arinia simplex
- Diplommatina alata (possibly extinct)
- Diplommatina aurea (possibly extinct)
- Diplommatina cacuminulus
- Diplommatina crassilabris
- Diplommatina gibboni (possibly extinct)
- Diplommatina madaiensis
- Diplommatina ringens
- Opisthostoma decrespignyi (possibly extinct)
- Opisthostoma fraternum
- Opisthostoma inornatum
- Opisthostoma jucundum
- Opisthostoma mirabile
- Opisthostoma otostoma (possibly extinct)
- Opisthostoma perspectivum
- Opisthostoma thersites
- Opisthostoma trapezium
- Palaina albata (possibly extinct)
- Palaina moussoni
- Palaina patula (possibly extinct)
- Palaina platycheilus (possibly extinct)
- Palaina pupa (possibly extinct)
- Palaina rubella
- Palaina striolata
- Plectostoma charasense (possibly extinct)
- Plectostoma dindingensis (possibly extinct)
- Plectostoma retrovertens
- Plectostoma turriforme (possibly extinct)
- Pseudopalaina polymorpha

==== Viviparids ====
- Bellamya liberiana
- Bellamya mweruensis
- Bellamya pagodiformis
- Margarya monodi
- Margarya yangtsunghaiensis (possibly extinct)

==== Other Architaenioglossa species ====
- Gonatorhaphe lauensis
- Lanistes neritoides
- Notharinia sp. 'Khoe La'
- Notharinia sp. 'Khoe La & Ong'
- Pomacea ocanensis
- Renea bourguignatiana

=== Cycloneritimorpha ===
- Neritina tiassalensis (possibly extinct)
- Ogasawarana chichijimana
- Ogasawarana habei
- Ogasawarana metamorpha
- Ogasawarana rex
- Ogasawarana yoshiwarana
- Theodoxus altenai
- Theodoxus baeticus
- Theodoxus valentinus

=== Hygrophila ===
Species

- Acroloxus macedonicus
- Australian freshwater limpet (Ancylastrum cumingianus)
- Ancylus ashangiensis
- Gyraulus ioanis
- Gyraulus shasi
- Lantzia carinata
- Lymnaea arachleica
- Wicker ancylid (Rhodacmea filosa)
- Segmentorbis excavatus
- Fat-whorled pondsnail (Stagnicola bonnevillensis)
- Thickshell pondsnail (Stagnicola utahensis) (possibly extinct)
- Tropinauta sinusdulcensis

Subspecies

- Bulinus tropicus torensis

=== Neogastropoda ===
- Conus lugubris
- Conus mordeirae
- Conus salreiensis

=== Other gastropod species ===
- Cincinna kizakikoensis
- Black abalone (Haliotis cracherodii)
- Siphonaria compressa

== Bivalvia ==
There are 69 species and five subspecies in the class Bivalvia assessed as critically endangered.

=== Unionida ===
There are 66 species and five subspecies in the order Unionoida assessed as critically endangered.

==== Margaritiferids ====
Species

- Spengler's freshwater mussel (Margaritifera auricularia)
- Louisiana pearlshell (Margaritifera hembeli)
- Margaritifera marocana

Subspecies

- Margaritifera margaritifera durrovensis

==== Etheriids ====
- Acostaea rivolii

==== Unionids ====
Species

- Appalachian elktoe (Alasmidonta raveneliana)
- Fat threeridge (Amblema neislerii)
- Amphinaias couchiana
- Anodonta lucasi
- Anodonta pallaryi
- Cuneopsis demangei (possibly extinct)
- Fanshell (Cyprogenia stegaria)
- Dromedary naiad (Dromus dromas)
- Recovery pearly mussel (Elliptio nigella)
- Tar River spiny mussel (Elliptio steinstansana)
- Cumberlandian combshell (Epioblasma brevidens)
- Upland combshell (Epioblasma metastriata)
- Southern acorn riffle shell (Epioblasma othcaloogensis) (possibly extinct)
- Penitent mussel (Epioblasma penita)
- Tubercled blossom (Epioblasma torulosa)
- Shiny pigtoe (Fusconaia cor)
- False spike (Fusconaia mitchelli)
- Cracking pearlymussel (Hemistena lata)
- Lamprotula crassa (possibly extinct)
- Lamprotula liedtkei (possibly extinct)
- Lamprotula nodulosa (possibly extinct)
- Lamprotula triclava
- Speckled pocketbook (Lampsilis streckeri)
- Alabama lamp naiad (Lampsilis virescens)
- Lanceolaria bilirata
- Carolina heelsplitter (Lasmigona decorata)
- Leguminaia saulcyi
- Birdwing pearlymussel (Lemiox rimosus)
- Lexingtonia subplana
- Gulf moccasinshell (Medionidus penicillatus)
- Ochlockonee moccasinshell (Medionidus simpsonianus)
- Suwannee moccasinshell (Medionidus walkeri)
- Haddleton lampmussel (Obovaria haddletoni) (possibly extinct)
- Golf stick pearly mussel (Obovaria retusa)
- Little winged pearly mussel (Pegias fabula)
- Physunio ferrugineus
- White warty-back pearly mussel (Plethobasus cicatricosus)
- Orange-footed pimpleback mussel (Plethobasus cooperianus)
- Painted clubshell (Pleurobema chattanoogaense)
- Club naiad (Pleurobema clava)
- James River spinymussel (Pleurobema collina)
- Black clubshell (Pleurobema curtum) (possibly extinct)
- Dark pigtoe (Pleurobema furvum)
- Southern pigtoe (Pleurobema georgianum)
- Cumberland pigtoe (Pleurobema gibberum)
- Georgia pigtoe (Pleurobema hanleyianum)
- Flat pigtoe (Pleurobema marshalli)
- Rough pigtoe pearly mussel (Pleurobema plenum)
- Warrior pigtoe (Pleurobema rubellum)
- Popenaias popeii
- Southern kidneyshell (Ptychobranchus jonesi)
- Winged mapleleaf (Quadrula fragosa)
- Rhombuniopsis tauriformis
- Theliderma intermedia
- Appalachian monkeyface (Theliderma sparsa)
- Stirrupshell (Theliderma stapes)
- Theliderma tuberosa
- Pale lilliput naiad (Toxolasma cylindrellus)
- Unio foucauldianus
- Purple bean (Villosa perpurpurea)
- Cumberland bean pearly mussel (Villosa trabalis)

Subspecies

- Curtis' naiad (Epioblasma florentina curtisi)
- Brown-blossom naiad (Epioblasma florentina walkeri)
- White catspaw (Epioblasma obliquata perobliqua)
- Northern riffleshell (Epioblasma torulosa rangiana)

==== Hyriids ====
- Glenelg freshwater mussel (Hyridella glenelgensis)

=== Venerida ===
- Dreissena caspia (possibly extinct)
- Eupera crassa
- Pisidium ethiopicum

== Cephalopods ==
- Opisthoteuthis chathamensis

== See also ==
- Lists of IUCN Red List critically endangered species
- List of least concern molluscs
- List of near threatened molluscs
- List of vulnerable molluscs
- List of endangered molluscs
- List of recently extinct molluscs
- List of data deficient molluscs
