= Prosadenoporus agricola =

Conservation status
- Critically endangered, possibly extinct (IUCN 3.1)

Scientific classification
- Kingdom: Animalia
- Phylum: Nemertea
- Class: Hoplonemertea
- Order: Monostilifera
- Family: Prosorhochmidae
- Genus: Prosadenoporus
- Species: P. agricola

Binomial name
- Prosadenoporus agricola (Willemoes-Suhm 1874)

Species of ribbon worm

Prosadenoporus agricola, also known as the Bermuda Islands mangrove ribbon worm, is a hermaphroditic viviparous ribbon worm native to Bermuda. The species has not recorded since 1966 and may be extinct.

== Etymology ==
The name reflects terrestrial habitat of this species (agricola = farmer, L).

== Description ==
Prosadenoporus species have terminal nephridial flame cells that characterize the species. Prosadenoporus agricola differs from most other Prosadenoporus species in being hermaphroditic and viviparous. Body color varies from uniform milk-white or grayish-white to orange, rosy, and greenish-brown or grayish-brown dorsally, and pale gray of whitish ventrally.

== Synonyms ==
- Neonemertes agricola
- Geonemertes agricola
- Pantinonemertes agricola (Willemoes-Suhm, 1874)
- Tetrastemma agricola

== Anatomy ==
Prosadenoporus agricola are bilaterally symmetrical and multicellular organisms. They have a vermiform (long, cylindrical) body shape and use ciliary gliding for locomotion. Their mineralized tissue contains calcium phosphate. Additionally, the species differs in having fewer proboscis nerves and by lacking neurochord cells.

The stylet base is rounded, pear shaped or truncated. Stylet length is 80-95 μm. There are 2 stylet accessory pouches and 12-15 proboscis nerves.

== Diet ==
Ribbon worms are predators of annelid (segmented) worms, clams, crabs, and some fish.

== Distribution and habitat ==
Prosadenoporus agricola are primarily found in Bermuda, in terrestrial and marine reef habitats. Terrestrial habitats occur at the drier margins of mangrove swamps and in moist earth under stones or matted algae on hillsides, in earthworm burrows. Marine habitats include Marine Intertidal and Marine Coastal/Supratidal. P. agricola are found along the shores of mangrove swamps, under stones and logs on moist, silty soil or inside burrows of earthworms above high-water mark and, during wet season, on adjacent hillsides.

== Conservation status ==
This species has decreased in abundance since 1905. It has not been recorded since 1966 and may be extinct. Population decline is likely due to continuing decline in habitat caused by development. At present, the extent of occurrence is estimated to be 53 km^{2} (20 sq mi) and the species may occur at only a single location. The species is assessed as Critically Endangered/Possibly Extinct (Moore et al., 2001)

The species is threatened by housing and urban areas, commercial and industrial areas, and tourism and recreation areas.
