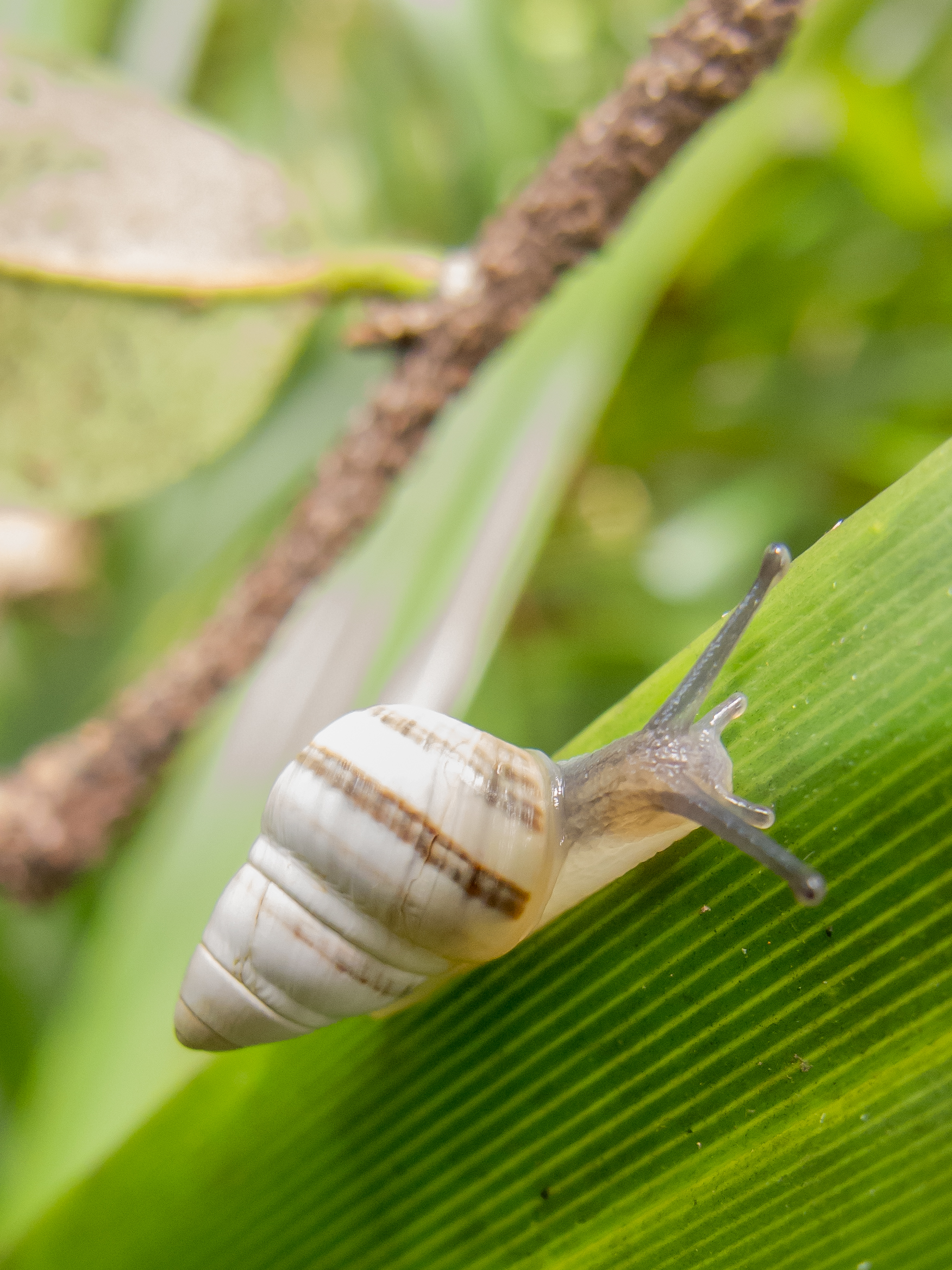

Conservation status
- Critically Endangered (IUCN 2.3)

- Critically Imperiled (NatureServe)
- CITES Appendix I

Scientific classification
- Kingdom: Animalia
- Phylum: Mollusca
- Class: Gastropoda
- Order: Stylommatophora
- Family: Achatinellidae
- Genus: Achatinella
- Subgenus: Achatinella
- Species: A. concavospira

Binomial name
- Achatinella concavospira Pfeiffer, 1859

= Achatinella concavospira =

Species of gastropod

Achatinella concavospira is a species of air-breathing land snail, a terrestrial pulmonate gastropod mollusk in the family Achatinellidae. This species is endemic to Hawaii.

== Description ==
Achatinella concavospira is a species of small tree snail, they have banded shells in a variety of different colors, sharing mostly with their cousin, Achatinella mustelina. Achatinella concavospira feeds on fungus and plant matter, and are mostly nocturnal.

== Distribution and habitat ==
Achatinella concavospira is endemic to Oahu. It can be found on the West Side of Oahu, in the Waianae Mountain Range. Populations of Achatinella concavospira are typically found at higher elevations, from 400 to 1'500 meters.

== Human usage & significance ==
Due to the varieties of color in their shells, along with the other members of their genus, Achatinella concavospira were widely sought out for by collectors.

== Conservation ==
Achatinella concavospira is currently considered as critically endangered. Multiple conservation attempts have been made to protect it from a variety of external factors with much success. Due to being threatened by invasive predators like the Rosy wolf snail, conservationists have resorted to captive breeding, as well as the creation of enclosures with no predators. These conservation efforts have resulted in a significant recovery of snail populations. However, captive rearing may cause a number of complications, such as lack of genetic variety within the species.
