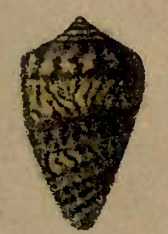
- Drawing of a shell of Conus lugubris

Conservation status
- Extinct (IUCN 3.1)

Scientific classification
- Kingdom: Animalia
- Phylum: Mollusca
- Class: Gastropoda
- Subclass: Caenogastropoda
- Order: Neogastropoda
- Superfamily: Conoidea
- Family: Conidae
- Genus: Conus
- Species: †C. lugubris

Binomial name
- †Conus lugubris Reeve, 1849

Synonyms
- Africonus lugubris (Reeve, 1849); Conus hieroglyphicus Kiener; Conus lugubris fuscus Barros e Cunha, 1933 (invalid: junior homonym of Conus mediterraneus var. fusca Bucquoy, Dautzenberg & Dollfus, 1882); Conus (Lautoconus) lugubris Reeve, 1849 - accepted, alternate representation

= Conus lugubris =

Species of sea snail

Conus lugubris was a species of sea snail, a marine gastropod mollusk in the family Conidae, the cone snails and their allies.

Like all species within the genus Conus, these snails are predatory and venomous. They are capable of stinging humans, therefore live ones should be handled carefully or not at all.

== Description ==
The size of the shell varies between 10 mm and 24 mm. The shell is finely striated, rudely ridged at the base with the ridges few and distant. The spire is conspicuously grooved. Its color is chocolate-black, obscurely reticulated here and there with numerous aggregated small white spots.

== Distribution ==
This species occurred only on the north coast of the island of São Vicente, Cape Verde. It was locally abundant in the Matiota Beach area and the last living specimen was seen in 1987, with tourism and coastal development leading to its extinction.
