= Pleurobema rubellum =

Conservation status
- Critically Endangered (IUCN 3.1)

- Critically Imperiled (NatureServe)

Scientific classification
- Kingdom: Animalia
- Phylum: Mollusca
- Class: Bivalvia
- Order: Unionida
- Family: Unionidae
- Genus: Pleurobema
- Species: P. rubellum

Binomial name
- Pleurobema rubellum (Conrad, 1834)

Synonyms
- Unio rubellus Conrad, 1834; Unio furvus Conrad, 1834; Unio pulvinulus I. Lea, 1845; Unio (Pleurobema) hagleri (Frierson, 1900; Margarita (Unio) rubellus (Conrad, 1834); Margaron (Unio) pulvinulus (I. Lea, 1845); Margaron (Unio) rubellus (Conrad, 1834); Pleurobema (Pleurobema) avellana (C. T. Simpson, 1900); Pleurobema (Pleurobema) hagleri ((Frierson, 1900); Pleurobema (Pleurobema) pulvinulum ((I. Lea, 1845); Pleurobema (Pleurobema) rubella ((Conrad, 1834); Pleurobema avellana C. T. Simpson, 1900; Pleurobema avellanum (C. T. Simpson, 1900); Pleurobema fictum Frierson, 1927; Pleurobema furvum (Conrad, 1834); Pleurobema hagleri (Frierson, 1900); Pleurobema pulvinulum (I. Lea, 1845)

Species of bivalve

Pleurobema rubellum, the warrior pigtoe, is a species of freshwater mussel in the family Unionidae. It is endemic to the United States and occurs in the Black Warrior River system, Alabama.

== Habitat and conservation ==
Pleurobema rubellum are usually found in sand or sand-gravel substrate in small rivers and large streams with clear water and moderate flow.

In the past, this species was widespread within the Black Warrior River system, but at present only few isolated populations remain as the consequence of habitat alteration (impoundment) and degradation (siltation, pollution). While several species are now classified as synonyms of Pleurobema rubellum, they continue to be listed separately by the IUCN: Pleurobema avellanum (hazel pigtoe) as "extinct", Pleurobema furvum (dark pigtoe) as "critically endangered", and Pleurobema hagleri (brown pigtoe) as "extinct". Pleurobema rubellum, assessed in 2012 separately from these former species, was also assessed as "critically endangered".
