= Alzoniella marianae =

Conservation status
- Critically Endangered (IUCN 3.1)

Scientific classification
- Kingdom: Animalia
- Phylum: Mollusca
- Class: Gastropoda
- Subclass: Caenogastropoda
- Order: Littorinimorpha
- Family: Hydrobiidae
- Genus: Alzoniella
- Species: A. marianae

Binomial name
- Alzoniella marianae Arconada, Rolán & Boeters, 2007

Synonyms
- Alzoniella (Alzoniella) marianae Arconada, Rolán & Boeters, 2007 · alternative representation

Species of gastropod

Alzoniella marianae is a species of very small aquatic snail, a spring snail, an operculate gastropod mollusc in the family Hydrobiidae.

== Description ==
The length of the shell varies between 1.3 mm and 1.73 mm, its diameter between 0.79 mm and 0.93 mm.

== Distribution ==
This species occurs about Asturias, Spain.
