= Aaadonta irregularis =

Conservation status
- Critically Endangered (IUCN 3.1)

Scientific classification
- Kingdom: Animalia
- Phylum: Mollusca
- Class: Gastropoda
- Order: Stylommatophora
- Family: Endodontidae
- Genus: Aaadonta
- Species: A. irregularis

Binomial name
- Aaadonta irregularis Semper, 1874

Synonyms
- Endodonta irregularis Semper, 1874; Helix irregularis (Semper, 1874)

Species of gastropod

Aaadonta irregularis is a species of snail, a terrestrial pulmonate gastropod mollusk in the family Endodontidae. It is endemic to Palau, where it was only known from Peleliu, but has only been found recently on the very small island of Omekang. It is threatened by the destruction and modification of its tropical moist lowland forest habitat.
