= New Mexico hotspring snail =

Conservation status
- Critically Endangered (IUCN 3.1)

- Critically Imperiled (NatureServe)

Scientific classification
- Kingdom: Animalia
- Phylum: Mollusca
- Class: Gastropoda
- Subclass: Caenogastropoda
- Order: Littorinimorpha
- Family: Hydrobiidae
- Genus: Pyrgulopsis
- Species: P. thermalis

Binomial name
- Pyrgulopsis thermalis (Taylor, 1987)

Synonyms
- Fontelicella thermalis Taylor, 1987

Species of gastropod

The New Mexico hotspring snail (Pyrgulopsis thermalis) is a species of small freshwater snail with an operculum, an aquatic gastropod mollusc or micromollusc in the family Hydrobiidae.

This species is endemic to the United States. Its natural habitat is hot springs. It is threatened by habitat loss.
