= Palaopartula leucothoe =

White Palau tree snail

Conservation status
- Critically endangered, possibly extinct (IUCN 3.1)

Scientific classification
- Kingdom: Animalia
- Phylum: Mollusca
- Class: Gastropoda
- Order: Stylommatophora
- Family: Partulidae
- Genus: Palaopartula
- Species: P. leucothoe

Binomial name
- Palaopartula leucothoe Semper, 1865

Synonyms
- Partula leucothoe

Species of gastropod

Palaopartula leucothoe is a species of air-breathing tropical land snail, a terrestrial pulmonate gastropod mollusk in the family Partulidae. This species is endemic to Palau.
