= Bulimulus ochsneri =

Conservation status
- Critically Endangered (IUCN 3.1)

Scientific classification
- Kingdom: Animalia
- Phylum: Mollusca
- Class: Gastropoda
- Order: Stylommatophora
- Family: Bulimulidae
- Genus: Bulimulus
- Species: B. ochsneri

Binomial name
- Bulimulus ochsneri W. H. Dall, 1917

Species of land snail

Bulimulus ochsneri Dall, 1917 is a species of tropical air-breathing land snail, a pulmonate gastropod mollusk in the subfamily Bulimulinae. It was originally described in the same genus it resides in today by Dall in 1917: Bulimulus (Naesiotus) ochsneri.

This species is endemic to the Galápagos Islands and specifically endemic to the island of Santa Cruz. It is a species in a remarkable pattern of adaptive radiation and speciation that has been documented in the Galápagos Islands. Its natural habitats are subtropical or tropical dry shrubland and subtropical or tropical dry lowland grassland. It is threatened by habitat loss and introduced species, such as rats and fire ants (Wasmannia auropunctata). This species is named for Washington Henry Ochsner (1879-1927), who was one of eight sailor-scientists on the 1905-06 scientific collecting expedition to the Galápagos Islands from the California Academy of Sciences in San Francisco.

A vigorous controversy developed between Washington Henry Ochsner in California and William Healey Dall in Washington, D.C., over who had the right to publish taxonomic descriptions of new species of Pulmonata collected during the 1905-06 Galápagos Expedition. This controversy lasted from 1916 until both men died in the same year, 1927, and it was not amicably resolved during their lifetimes. A similar controversy developed over the right to publish and describe new species of Late Cenozoic marine mollusks, which resulted in the two men being brought together posthumously in two publications by editors of the Proceedings of the California Academy of Sciences.
