= Semperdon kororensis =

Conservation status
- Critically Endangered (IUCN 3.1)

Scientific classification
- Kingdom: Animalia
- Phylum: Mollusca
- Class: Gastropoda
- Order: Stylommatophora
- Family: Charopidae
- Genus: Semperdon
- Species: S. kororensis

Binomial name
- Semperdon kororensis (E.H.Beddome, 1889)

Synonyms
- Helix (Endodonta) kororensis E.H.Beddome, 1889

Species of gastropod

Semperdon kororensis is a species of small, air-breathing land snails, terrestrial pulmonate gastropod molluscs in the family Charopidae. This species is endemic to Palau.
