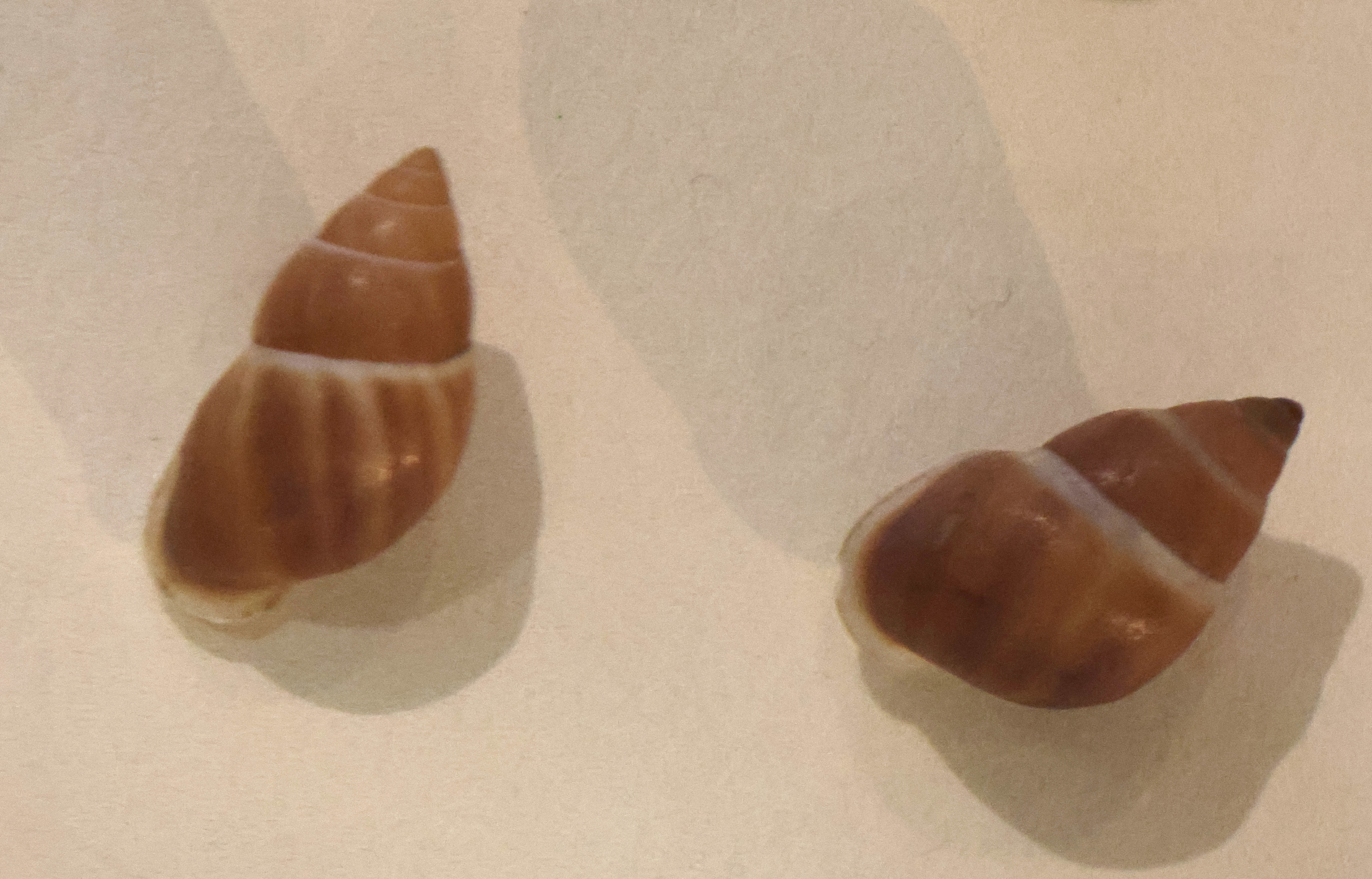

Conservation status
- Critically endangered, possibly extinct (IUCN 3.1)

Scientific classification
- Kingdom: Animalia
- Phylum: Mollusca
- Class: Gastropoda
- Order: Stylommatophora
- Family: Partulidae
- Genus: Partula
- Species: P. rufa

Binomial name
- Partula rufa Lesson, 1831

Synonyms
- Partula martensiana Pilsbry, 1909

= Partula rufa =

Species of gastropod

Partula rufa is a species of air-breathing tropical land snail, a terrestrial pulmonate gastropod mollusk in the family Partulidae. This species is endemic to Micronesia.
