= Henrigirardia =

Conservation status
- Critically endangered, possibly extinct (IUCN 3.1)

Scientific classification
- Kingdom: Animalia
- Phylum: Mollusca
- Class: Gastropoda
- Subclass: Caenogastropoda
- Order: Littorinimorpha
- Family: Moitessieriidae
- Genus: Henrigirardia; Boeters & Falkner, 2003
- Species: H. wienini

Binomial name
- Henrigirardia wienini (Girardi, 2001)

Genus of gastropods

Henrigirardia wienini is a species of terrestrial gastropod in the family Moitessieriidae endemic to caves near Aniane, France. It is the sole species in the genus Henrigirardia. H. wienini inhabits subterranean waters in two localities in the Fontanilles cave-river, and the type locality in the Herault Valley. It is listed by the IUCN (ver. 3.1) as Critically Endangered with the caveat 'possibly extinct' on IUCN criterion B1ab(iii) due to threats from ongoing water abstraction for domestic and agricultural purposes. Although it is not as significant or possibly not present, agricultural and domestic pollution can be dangerous to subterranean species. Specimens grow to 1.5mm, and have a characteristic thrown-out last whorl and aperture. The tuba ends on an out turned aperture that reflexes up to 90 degrees upwards.
