= Bellamya pagodiformis =

Conservation status
- Critically Endangered (IUCN 3.1)

Scientific classification
- Kingdom: Animalia
- Phylum: Mollusca
- Class: Gastropoda
- Subclass: Caenogastropoda
- Order: Architaenioglossa
- Family: Viviparidae
- Genus: Bellamya
- Species: B. pagodiformis

Binomial name
- Bellamya pagodiformis (Smith, 1893)

Species of gastropod

Bellamya pagodiformis is a species of large freshwater snail with a gill and an operculum, an aquatic gastropod mollusc in the family Viviparidae.

This species is found in the Democratic Republic of the Congo and Zambia.
