= Marstonia castor =

Beaverpond Marstonia

Conservation status
- Critically Endangered (IUCN 3.1)

- Critically Imperiled (NatureServe)

Scientific classification
- Kingdom: Animalia
- Phylum: Mollusca
- Class: Gastropoda
- Subclass: Caenogastropoda
- Order: Littorinimorpha
- Family: Hydrobiidae
- Genus: Marstonia
- Species: M. castor

Binomial name
- Marstonia castor F. G. Thompson, 1977

Synonyms
- Pyrgulopsis castor (F. G. Thompson, 1977)

Species of gastropod

Marstonia castor, common name the beaver pond marstonia, is a species of very small freshwater snail with a gill and an operculum, an aquatic operculate gastropod mollusc in the family Hydrobiidae. This species was endemic to a very limited area of the US state of Georgia, mostly to streams and creeks around Lake Blackshear.

The US Fish and Wildlife Service declared this species extinct in December 2017 on the basis that it had not been seen since 2000. It was likely wiped out by groundwater withdrawal, pollution, and urbanization. However, the IUCN Red List still lists it as Critically Endangered.
