= Caledoconcha carnosa =

Conservation status
- Critically Endangered (IUCN 3.1)

Scientific classification
- Kingdom: Animalia
- Phylum: Mollusca
- Class: Gastropoda
- Subclass: Caenogastropoda
- Order: Littorinimorpha
- Family: Tateidae
- Genus: Caledoconcha
- Species: C. carnosa

Binomial name
- Caledoconcha carnosa Haase & Bouchet, 1998

Species of gastropod

Caledoconcha carnosa is a species of snail of the family Tateidae. The species is endemic to Monéo River of New Caledonia, and is classed as Critically endangered due to the destruction of its habitat.
