= Videna pumila =

Conservation status
- Critically Endangered (IUCN 3.1)

Scientific classification
- Kingdom: Animalia
- Phylum: Mollusca
- Class: Gastropoda
- Order: Stylommatophora
- Family: Trochomorphidae
- Genus: Videna
- Species: V. pumila

Binomial name
- Videna pumila H. B. Baker, 1941

Species of gastropod

Videna pumila is a species of terrestrial pulmonate gastropod mollusks in the family Trochomorphidae.

This species is endemic to Palau.
