= Elimia troostiana =

Mossy Elimia

Conservation status
- Critically endangered, possibly extinct (IUCN 3.1)

- Critically Imperiled (NatureServe)

Scientific classification
- Kingdom: Animalia
- Phylum: Mollusca
- Class: Gastropoda
- Subclass: Caenogastropoda
- Order: incertae sedis
- Family: Pleuroceridae
- Genus: Elimia
- Species: E. troostiana

Binomial name
- Elimia troostiana (I. Lea, 1838)

Synonyms
- Melania troostiana I. Lea, 1838

Species of gastropod

Elimia troostiana, the Mossy Elimia, is a species of freshwater snail with an operculum, aquatic gastropod mollusc in the family Pleuroceridae. This species is endemic to the Mossy Creek district of Jefferson County, Tennessee in the United States, for which it is named.
