= Bulimulus hirsutus =

Conservation status
- Critically Endangered (IUCN 3.1)

Scientific classification
- Kingdom: Animalia
- Phylum: Mollusca
- Class: Gastropoda
- Order: Stylommatophora
- Family: Bulimulidae
- Genus: Bulimulus
- Species: B. hirsutus

Binomial name
- Bulimulus hirsutus (Vagvolgyi, 1977)

Species of gastropod

Bulimulus hirsutus is a species of gastropod in the Orthalicidae family. It is endemic to Ecuador. Its natural habitat is subtropical or tropical dry shrubland. It is threatened by habitat loss.
