= Graecoanatolica conica =

Conservation status
- Critically endangered, possibly extinct (IUCN 3.1)

Scientific classification
- Kingdom: Animalia
- Phylum: Mollusca
- Class: Gastropoda
- Subclass: Caenogastropoda
- Order: Littorinimorpha
- Family: Hydrobiidae
- Genus: Graecoanatolica
- Species: G. conica

Binomial name
- Graecoanatolica conica (Radoman, 1973)

Species of gastropod

Graecoanatolica conica is a species of freshwater snail, an aquatic gastropod mollusk in the family Hydrobiidae. The species is endemic to a spring between the Turkish villages of Çardak and Dazkırı.
