= Aaadonta angaurana =

Conservation status
- Critically endangered, possibly extinct (IUCN 3.1)

Scientific classification
- Kingdom: Animalia
- Phylum: Mollusca
- Class: Gastropoda
- Order: Stylommatophora
- Family: Endodontidae
- Genus: Aaadonta
- Species: A. angaurana

Binomial name
- Aaadonta angaurana Solem, 1976

Species of land snail

Aaadonta angaurana is a small air-breathing land snail, a terrestrial pulmonate gastropod mollusc in the family Endodontidae.

== Distribution ==
This species is endemic to Angaur in the Palau Islands, as all members of the genus Aaadonta are endemic to Palau. It is known only from one locality, where it was last found in 1936. None have been found recently (As Of 2026) and they may be extinct.
