= Bulimulus deridderi =

Conservation status
- Critically endangered, possibly extinct (IUCN 3.1)

Scientific classification
- Kingdom: Animalia
- Phylum: Mollusca
- Class: Gastropoda
- Order: Stylommatophora
- Family: Bulimulidae
- Genus: Bulimulus
- Species: B. deridderi

Binomial name
- Bulimulus deridderi (Coppois MS)

Species of gastropod

Bulimulus deridderi is an unavailable name for an undescribed species of tropical air-breathing land snail, a pulmonate gastropod mollusk in the subfamily Bulimulinae.

This species is endemic to Ecuador. Its natural habitat is subtropical or tropical dry forests. It is threatened by habitat loss.
