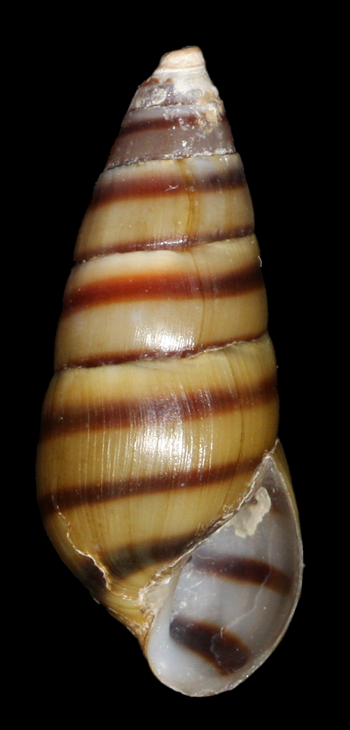
- Lectotype of Elimia annettae (UMMZ 128908)

Conservation status
- Critically Endangered (IUCN 2.3)

- Critically Imperiled (NatureServe)

Scientific classification
- Kingdom: Animalia
- Phylum: Mollusca
- Class: Gastropoda
- Subclass: Caenogastropoda
- Order: incertae sedis
- Family: Pleuroceridae
- Genus: Elimia
- Species: E. annettae

Binomial name
- Elimia annettae Goodrich, 1941

= Lily Shoals elimia =

Species of snail

The Lily Shoals elimia, scientific name Elimia annettae, is a species of freshwater snails with an operculum, aquatic gastropod mollusks in the family Pleuroceridae. This species is endemic to the United States.
