= Graecoanatolica vegorriticola =

Conservation status
- Critically Endangered (IUCN 3.1)

Scientific classification
- Kingdom: Animalia
- Phylum: Mollusca
- Class: Gastropoda
- Subclass: Caenogastropoda
- Order: Littorinimorpha
- Family: Hydrobiidae
- Genus: Graecoanatolica
- Species: G. vegorriticola

Binomial name
- Graecoanatolica vegorriticola (Schütt, 1962)

Species of gastropod

Graecoanatolica vegorriticola is a hydrobiid gastropod endemic to littoral habitats in Lake Vegorritis and Lake Patron. It is listed as Critically Endangered by the IUCN, mainly due to habitat loss as a result of the eutrophication of Lake Patron, and the effects of pollution upon the remaining suitable habitat near Lake Vegoritida. When described, it was reported that the species was found in great abundance on the margins of Lake Vegorritis, but in 2006 only the remnants of the original population were found.
