= Amastra micans =

Conservation status
- Critically Endangered (IUCN 2.3)

- Critically Imperiled (NatureServe)

Scientific classification
- Kingdom: Animalia
- Phylum: Mollusca
- Class: Gastropoda
- Order: Stylommatophora
- Family: Amastridae
- Genus: Amastra
- Species: A. micans

Binomial name
- Amastra micans (L. Pfeiffer, 1859)

Species of gastropod

Amastra micans, commonly known as the Amastrid land snail, is a species of land snail, a terrestrial pulmonate gastropod mollusk in the family Amastridae. It is a critically endangered species and endemic to the Hawaiian Islands, mainly found in the Waianae Mountains of Oahu.

== Description ==
Amastra micans is tiny to medium-sized, with their shell measuring an average of 15mm in height and 9mm in width. The shell is elongated and conical in shape, coiled in a dextral (right-handed) spiral with a pointed apex. Their shell's surface is smooth and polished, with a wide range of colors and patterns, typically light brown to dark brown, with a white or cream-colored apex.

Amastra micans feed on waste.

== Distribution and habitat ==
This species is endemic to the Hawaiian islands, being only found on the island of Oahu. They are particularly located in the Waianae Mountains.

Amastra micans inhabit leaves and trees, notably the leaf litter of the native tree Pipturus albidus.

== Conservation status ==
Amastra micans is classified as critically imperiled and faces various threats to its survival, including habitat loss and predation. However, they have been relocated to a protected habitat and now only live in the central Waianae range, following extensive efforts with the Hawaii State Division of Forestry and Wildlife and Bishop Museum.
