= Aaadonta kinlochi =

Conservation status
- Critically Endangered (IUCN 3.1)

Scientific classification
- Kingdom: Animalia
- Phylum: Mollusca
- Class: Gastropoda
- Order: Stylommatophora
- Family: Endodontidae
- Genus: Aaadonta
- Species: A. kinlochi

Binomial name
- Aaadonta kinlochi Solem, 1976

Species of gastropod

Aaadonta kinlochi is a species of snail, a terrestrial pulmonate gastropod mollusk in the family Endodontidae. It is endemic to Palau, where it was known from Angaur and Ulong Island. If it is still extant, it is threatened by the destruction and modification of its tropical moist lowland forest habitat.
