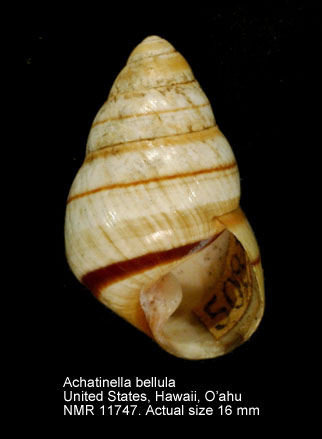

Conservation status
- Critically Endangered (IUCN 2.3)

- Possibly Extinct (NatureServe)
- CITES Appendix I

Scientific classification
- Kingdom: Animalia
- Phylum: Mollusca
- Class: Gastropoda
- Order: Stylommatophora
- Family: Achatinellidae
- Genus: Achatinella
- Subgenus: Achatinellastrum
- Species: A. bellula

Binomial name
- Achatinella bellula Smith, 1873

= Achatinella bellula =

Species of gastropod

Achatinella bellula is a species of air-breathing land snail, a terrestrial pulmonate gastropod mollusk in the family Achatinellidae. This species is endemic to the Hawaiian island of Oahu in the United States. No more than five specimens have been observed since 1979.
