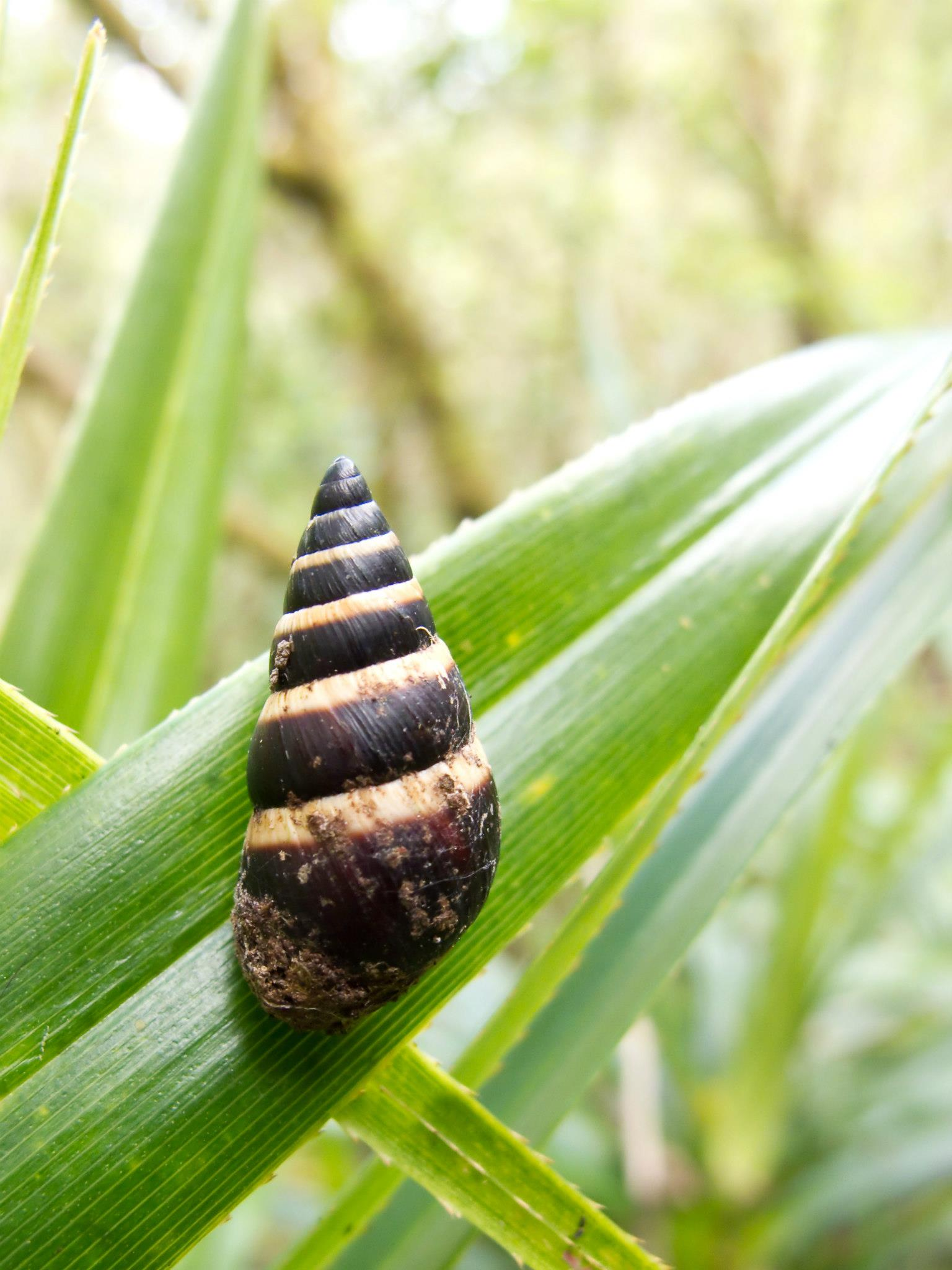
- Live individual at Palikea, Oahu

Conservation status
- Critically Endangered (IUCN 2.3)

- Critically Imperiled (NatureServe)

Scientific classification
- Kingdom: Animalia
- Phylum: Mollusca
- Class: Gastropoda
- Order: Stylommatophora
- Family: Amastridae
- Genus: Amastra
- Species: A. spirizona

Binomial name
- Amastra spirizona Quoy & Gaimard, 1825

Synonyms
- Achatinella acuta W.J. Swainson; Helix spirizona Quoy & Gaimard, 1825

= Amastra spirizona =

Species of gastropod

Amastra spirizona is a species of land snail, a terrestrial pulmonate gastropod mollusk in the Amastridae family.

== Subspecies ==
- Amastra spirizona chlorotica (L. Pfeiffer, 1856)
- Amastra spirizona nigrolabris E.A. Smith, 1873
- Amastra spirizona rudis L. Pfeiffer, 1855

== Description ==
The length of the shell of Amastra spirizona attains 18 mm. The shell is conical in shape, opaque, and sculptured with fine ridges. Within the shell is a small body with elongated eyes and a rough outer texture.

== Distribution and habitat ==
Amastra spirizona is endemic to Hawaii. It can be found in trees, specifically ekaha ferns (Asplenium nidus) and ōpuhe leaves (Touchardia sandwicensis) in the Waianae mountain range on the island of Oahu.

== Conservation status ==
Amastra spirizona has been collected by researchers from their original range in the Waianae mountains. Precisely thirty snails were captured to stop the population from further declining in 2015. This species is preyed on by animals, which includes rats, cannibal snails, and chameleons, but is not considered federally or state endangered. The Snail Extinction Prevention Program (SEPP) released around 1200 snails, including Amastra spirizona, into a predator-free enclosure that they keep well-maintained.
