= Alzoniella iberopyrenaica =

Conservation status
- Critically Endangered (IUCN 3.1)

Scientific classification
- Kingdom: Animalia
- Phylum: Mollusca
- Class: Gastropoda
- Subclass: Caenogastropoda
- Order: Littorinimorpha
- Family: Hydrobiidae
- Genus: Alzoniella
- Species: A. iberopyrenaica

Binomial name
- Alzoniella iberopyrenaica Arconada, Rolán & Boeters, 2007

Synonyms
- Alzoniella (Alzoniella) iberopyrenaica Arconada, Rolán & Boeters, 2007 · alternative representation

Species of gastropod

Alzoniella iberopyrenaica is a species of very small aquatic snail, a spring snail, an operculate gastropod mollusc in the family Hydrobiidae.

== Description ==
The length of the shell attains 1.4 mm, its diameter 0.67 mm.

== Distribution ==
This species occurs in the north of the Iberian Peninsula.
