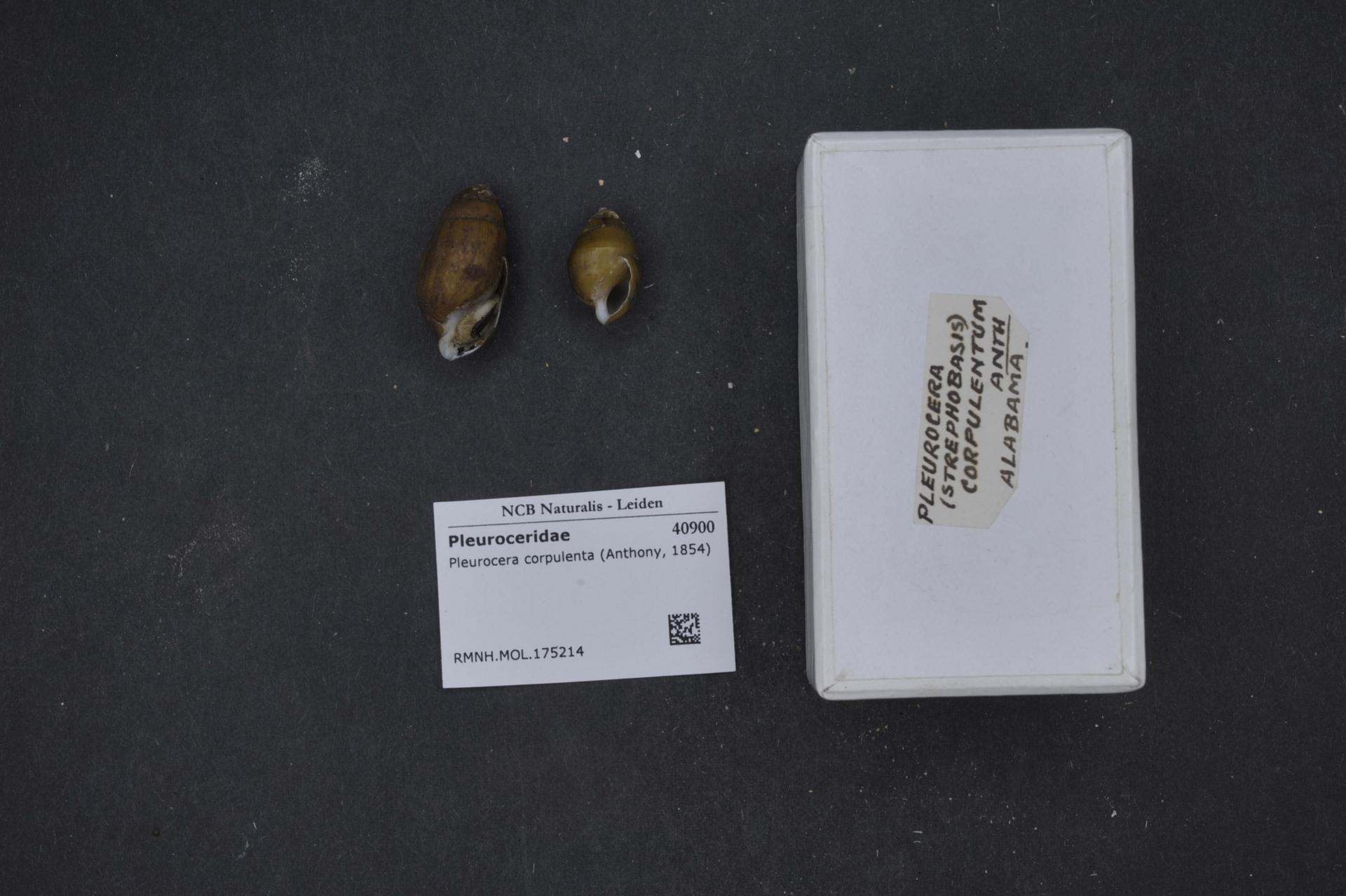

Conservation status
- Critically Endangered (IUCN 3.1)

- Critically Imperiled (NatureServe)

Scientific classification
- Kingdom: Animalia
- Phylum: Mollusca
- Class: Gastropoda
- Subclass: Caenogastropoda
- Order: incertae sedis
- Family: Pleuroceridae
- Genus: Pleurocera
- Species: P. corpulenta

Binomial name
- Pleurocera corpulenta (Anthony, 1854)

Synonyms
- Melania corpulenta Anthony, 1854

= Corpulent hornsnail =

Species of gastropod

The corpulent hornsnail, scientific name Pleurocera corpulenta, is a species of freshwater snail with an operculum, an aquatic gastropod mollusc in the family Pleuroceridae. This species is endemic to the United States.
