= Opisthostoma jucundum =

Conservation status
- Critically Endangered (IUCN 3.1)

Scientific classification
- Kingdom: Animalia
- Phylum: Mollusca
- Class: Gastropoda
- Subclass: Caenogastropoda
- Order: Architaenioglossa
- Family: Diplommatinidae
- Genus: Opisthostoma
- Species: O. jucundum

Binomial name
- Opisthostoma jucundum E.A. Smith, 1893

Species of gastropod

Opisthostoma jucundum is a species of land snail with an operculum, a terrestrial gastropod mollusc in the family Diplommatinidae.

This species is endemic to the island of Mantanani Besar, Sabah, Malaysia. The species is found solely on an exposed limestone ridge near the northern end of Mantanani Besar within tropical coastal forests. The extent of its occurrence is less than 1 km^{2}, and is threatened by habitat loss. Local villages and plantations of bananas and tropical fruit have encroached upon the limestone cliffs, leading to the desiccation of the forests in the region. The population of the species is decreasing.
