= Pleurobema chattanoogaense =

Conservation status
- Critically Endangered (IUCN 2.3)

Scientific classification
- Kingdom: Animalia
- Phylum: Mollusca
- Class: Bivalvia
- Order: Unionida
- Family: Unionidae
- Genus: Pleurobema
- Species: P. chattanoogaense

Binomial name
- Pleurobema chattanoogaense (I. Lea, 1858)

Species of bivalve

Pleurobema chattanoogaense, the painted clubshell, is a species of freshwater mussel, an aquatic bivalve mollusk in the family Unionidae, the river mussels.

This species is endemic to the United States. Its natural habitat is rivers.
