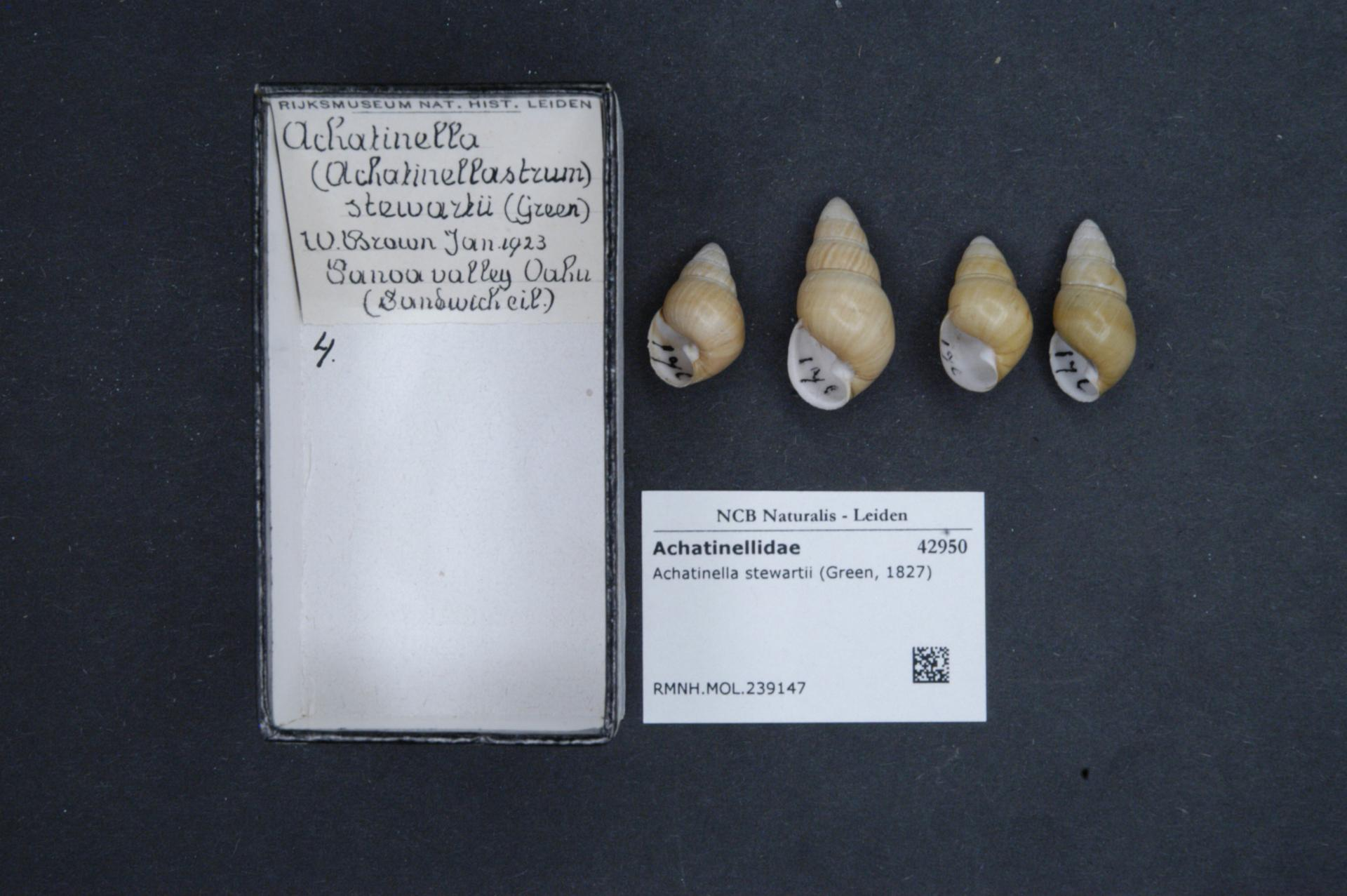

Conservation status
- Critically Endangered (IUCN 2.3)

- Possibly Extinct (NatureServe)
- CITES Appendix I

Scientific classification
- Kingdom: Animalia
- Phylum: Mollusca
- Class: Gastropoda
- Order: Stylommatophora
- Family: Achatinellidae
- Genus: Achatinella
- Subgenus: Achatinellastrum
- Species: A. stewartii

Binomial name
- Achatinella stewartii (Green, 1827)

= Achatinella stewartii =

Species of gastropod

Achatinella stewartii is a species of air-breathing land snail, a terrestrial pulmonate gastropod mollusk in the family Achatinellidae. This species is endemic to Hawaii.

Achatinella stewartii (Green, 1827) is the type species of the subgenus Achatinellastrum.
