= Southern kidneyshell =

Conservation status
- Critically Endangered (IUCN 3.1)

- Critically Imperiled (NatureServe)

Scientific classification
- Kingdom: Animalia
- Phylum: Mollusca
- Class: Bivalvia
- Order: Unionida
- Family: Unionidae
- Genus: Ptychobranchus
- Species: P. jonesi

Binomial name
- Ptychobranchus jonesi (van der Schalie, 1934)

Species of bivalve

The southern kidneyshell (Ptychobranchus jonesi) is a species of freshwater mussel, an aquatic bivalve mollusk in the family Unionidae, the river mussels.

This species is endemic to the United States.
