= Mautodontha boraborensis =

Conservation status
- Critically Endangered (IUCN 2.3)

Scientific classification
- Kingdom: Animalia
- Phylum: Mollusca
- Class: Gastropoda
- Order: Stylommatophora
- Family: Charopidae
- Genus: Mautodontha
- Species: M. boraborensis

Binomial name
- Mautodontha boraborensis Garrett, 1884

Species of gastropod

Mautodontha boraborensis is a species of gastropod in the family Charopidae. It is endemic to French Polynesia.
