= Mautodontha ceuthma =

Conservation status
- Critically Endangered (IUCN 2.3)

Scientific classification
- Kingdom: Animalia
- Phylum: Mollusca
- Class: Gastropoda
- Order: Stylommatophora
- Family: Charopidae
- Genus: Mautodontha
- Species: M. ceuthma

Binomial name
- Mautodontha ceuthma Solem, 1976

Species of gastropod

Mautodontha ceuthma is a species of small air-breathing land snails, terrestrial pulmonate gastropod mollusks in the family Charopidae. This species is endemic to French Polynesia.
