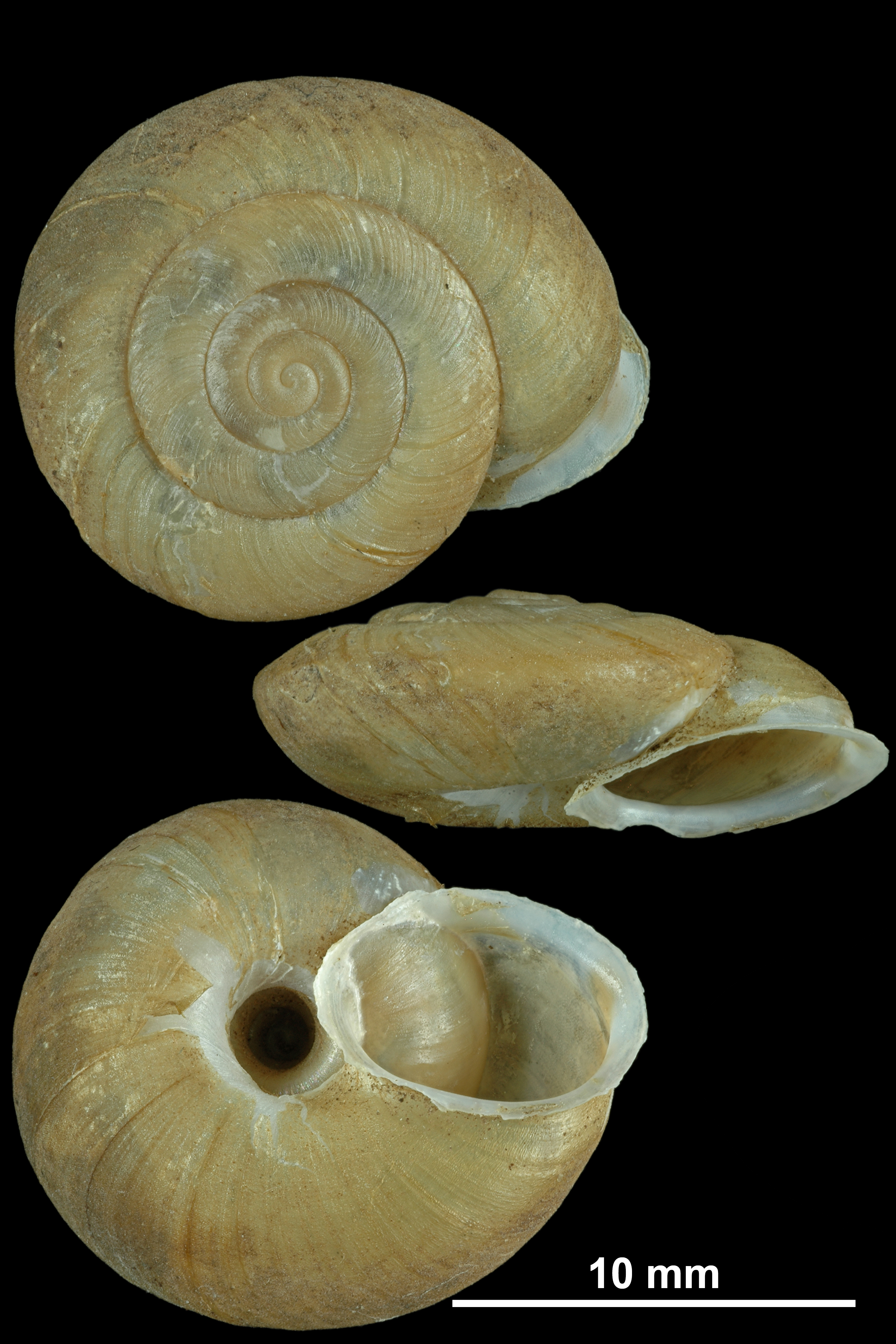
- Chilostoma crombezi

Conservation status
- Critically Endangered (IUCN 3.1)

Scientific classification
- Domain: Eukaryota
- Kingdom: Animalia
- Phylum: Mollusca
- Class: Gastropoda
- Order: Stylommatophora
- Family: Helicidae
- Genus: Chilostoma
- Species: C. crombezi

Binomial name
- Chilostoma crombezi (Locard, 1882)

= Chilostoma crombezi =

Species of gastropod

Chilostoma crombezi is a species of medium-sized, air-breathing, land snail, a terrestrial pulmonate gastropod mollusk in the family Helicidae, the true snails. The species is endemic in France, and is currently Critically endangered.
