= Napaeus isletae =

Conservation status
- Critically Endangered (IUCN 3.1)

Scientific classification
- Kingdom: Animalia
- Phylum: Mollusca
- Class: Gastropoda
- Order: Stylommatophora
- Family: Enidae
- Genus: Napaeus
- Species: N. isletae

Binomial name
- Napaeus isletae Groh & Ibanez, 1992

Species of gastropod

Napaeus isletae is a species of air-breathing land snail, a terrestrial pulmonate gastropod mollusk in the family Enidae. This species is endemic to Spain.
