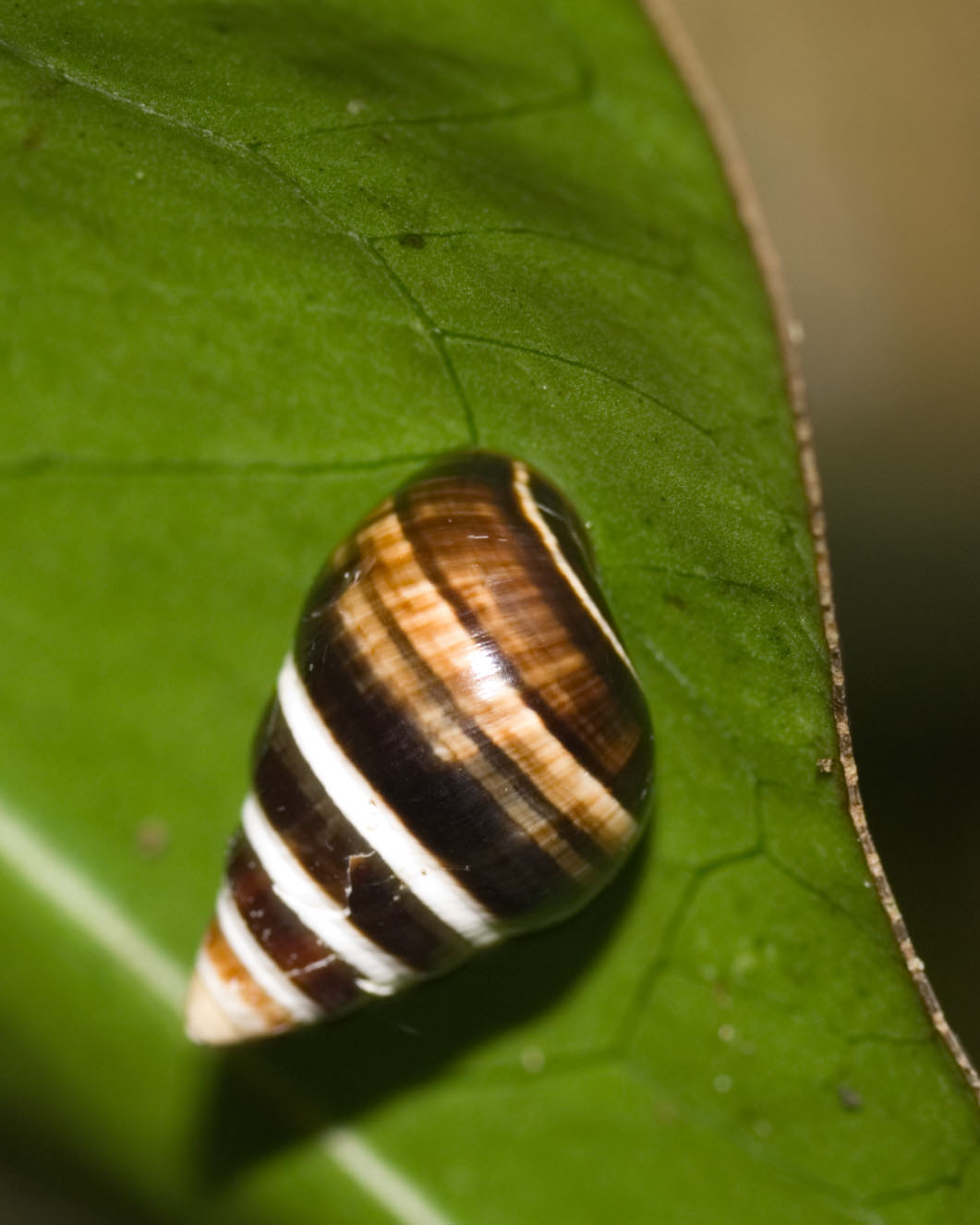

Conservation status
- Critically Endangered (IUCN 2.3)

- Critically Imperiled (NatureServe)
- CITES Appendix I

Scientific classification
- Kingdom: Animalia
- Phylum: Mollusca
- Class: Gastropoda
- Order: Stylommatophora
- Family: Achatinellidae
- Genus: Achatinella
- Subgenus: Achatinella
- Species: A. mustelina

Binomial name
- Achatinella mustelina Mighels, 1845

= Achatinella mustelina =

Species of gastropod

Achatinella mustelina is a species of air-breathing land snail, a terrestrial pulmonate gastropod mollusc in the family Achatinellidae. This species is endemic to the Waianae Range of the island of Oahu, Hawaii.

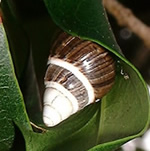
Achatinella mustelina

All 13 subspecies of Achatinella mustelina were synonymized with the species by Holland & Hadfield (2007), because they are not monophyletic.

== Habitat ==
Achatinella mustelina can be found in elevated forests that are dry, wet, or mesic. Achatinella mustelina attaches itself to leaves at the tops of native trees and shrubs such as Metrosideros polymorpha, Dubautia plantanginea, Myrsine lessertiana, Antidesma platyphyllum and Nestegis sandwicensis. Some individuals may live on a single tree for their entire lifetime. The range of temperature Achatinella mustelina typical live in is 20 degrees Celsius during the day and 16 degrees Celsius at night.

Range elevation: 600 to 1,158 m (1,970 to 3,800 ft)

== Physical description ==
Achatinella mustelina from different locations vary in size, shape, and color. Adults range from 19 to 24 mm (0.75 to 0.94 in) in length, with an average length of 21.4 mm (0.84 in). The shells have a shiny finish and are usually brown with light bands that circle the suture convex, or they are white with transverse black or brown lines.

== Diet ==
Achatinella mustelina feeds primarily at night. This feeding strategy is an adaptation to avoid daytime predators. Both adults and juveniles graze on fungus on surface of leaves at night.

== Lifespan ==
Achatinella mustelina has long lifespan compared to other terrestrial gastropods. Longevity is estimated to be 10 years, but individuals may live up to 15 to 20 years.

== Reproduction ==
Achatinella mustelina is hermaphroditic and may self-fertilize. Achatinella mustelina can self-fertilize because this reproductive strategy is driven by low population densities, reducing the likelihood of finding a mate. Self-fertilization ensures reproductive success in the face of limited mate availability. They have a lengthy gestation period and give birth to large, live young that mature late and have a low fecundity. Maturity is estimated to occur at an age of 6.9 years. Achatinella mustelina sexual maturity is more age dependant than size dependant. Achatinella mustelina breeds year-round.

== Development ==
Achatinella mustelina develop from an intrauterine embryo. Achatinella mustelina exhibits slow growth. Reasons for the slow growth rate seen in Achatinella mustelina can only be speculative. It may be related either to limited quantities or low nutritional value of the resource on which these snails feed.

== Threats to the population ==
Achatinella mustelina are rapidly becoming extinct. There are many threats to this species, largely invasive predatory species. Achatinella is a highly diverse group, comprising 41 described species, but only nine species remain today. Trioceros jacksonii xantholophus and Euglandina rosea are two invasive predatory species that are largely contributing to Achatinella mustelina's population decline. Hundreds of chameleons born in pet stores located on the west coast of the USA were imported and released at numerous places in Hawaii. Trioceros jacksonii xantholophus was one of these species. After much research it was found that over a one year period for every 2000 m2 chameleons at this density could consume 730 - 974 tree snails. Euglandina rosea are predatory snails found in similar habitats to Achatinella mustelina. It was found that the breakage of dead Achatinella mustelina shells were consistent with Euglandina rosea breakage patterns, concluding that Euglandina rosea is one of the cause for the excessive death rates of Achatinella mustelina.
