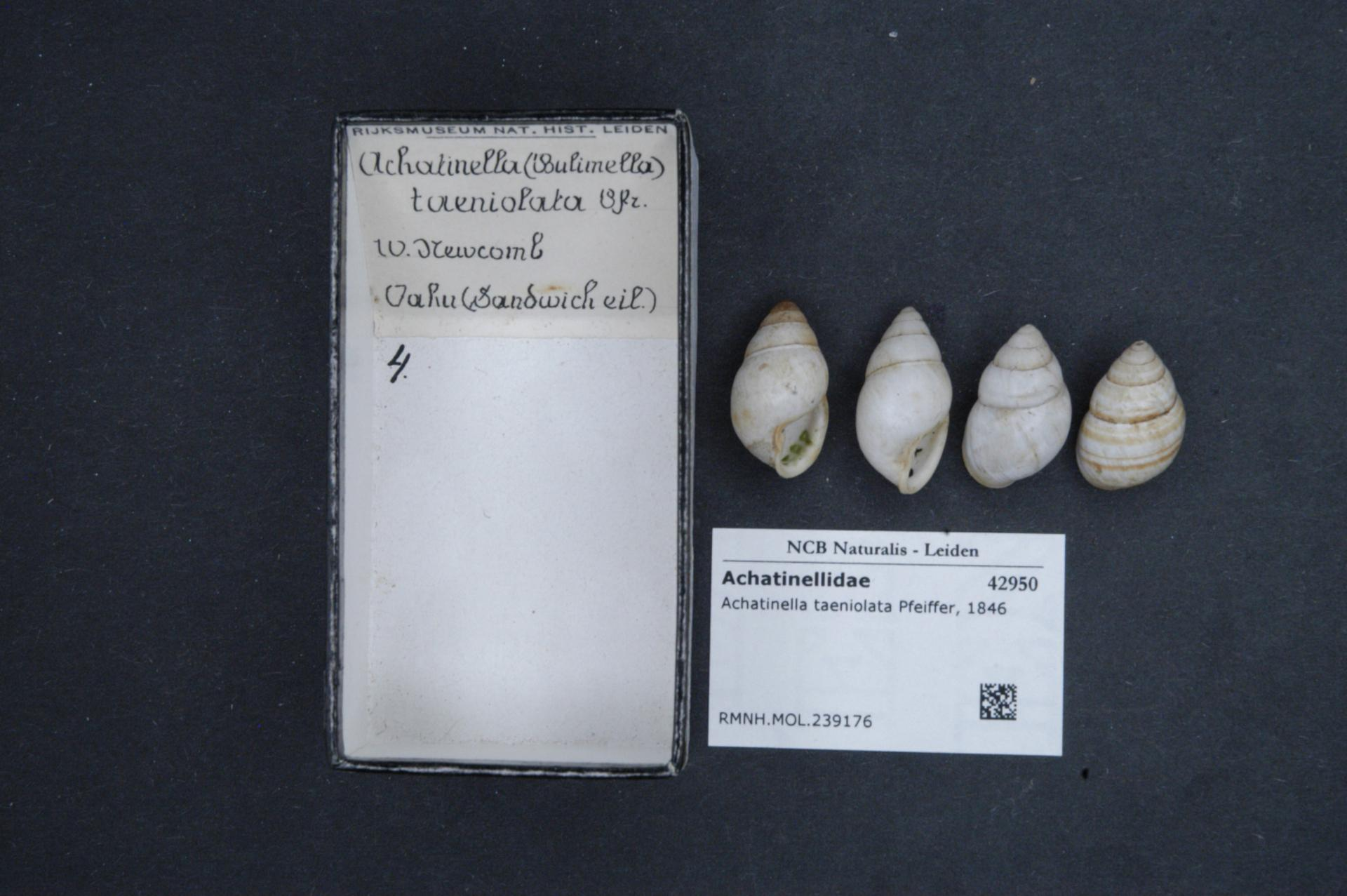

Conservation status
- Critically Endangered (IUCN 2.3)

- Possibly Extinct (NatureServe)
- CITES Appendix I

Scientific classification
- Kingdom: Animalia
- Phylum: Mollusca
- Class: Gastropoda
- Order: Stylommatophora
- Family: Achatinellidae
- Genus: Achatinella
- Subgenus: Bulimella
- Species: A. taeniolata

Binomial name
- Achatinella taeniolata Pfeiffer, 1846

Synonyms
- Achatinella rubiginosa Newcomb

= Achatinella taeniolata =

Species of gastropod

Achatinella taeniolata, an O'ahu tree snail, is a species of colorful, tropical, tree-living, air-breathing land snail, an arboreal pulmonate gastropod mollusc in the family Achatinellidae.

This taxon is a subspecies of Achatinella viridans as there is a complete intergradation between them.

== Shell description ==
The dextral shell is ovate-oblong, spiro-conic, solid, striatulate. The shell is more obsolete toward the apex and with slightly convex whorls. The shell has six whorls. Shell colors are glossy white ornamented with varying brown bands. The white columella is strongly toothed above and the margin is dilated, reflexed and appressed. The white aperture is irregularly semioval. The peristome is narrowly thickened outside, and strongly lipped within.

The height of the shell is 20.0 mm. The width of the shell is 11.0 mm.

== Distribution ==
This species is endemic to the Hawaiian island of O`ahu.

== Conservation status ==
This species is critically endangered.
