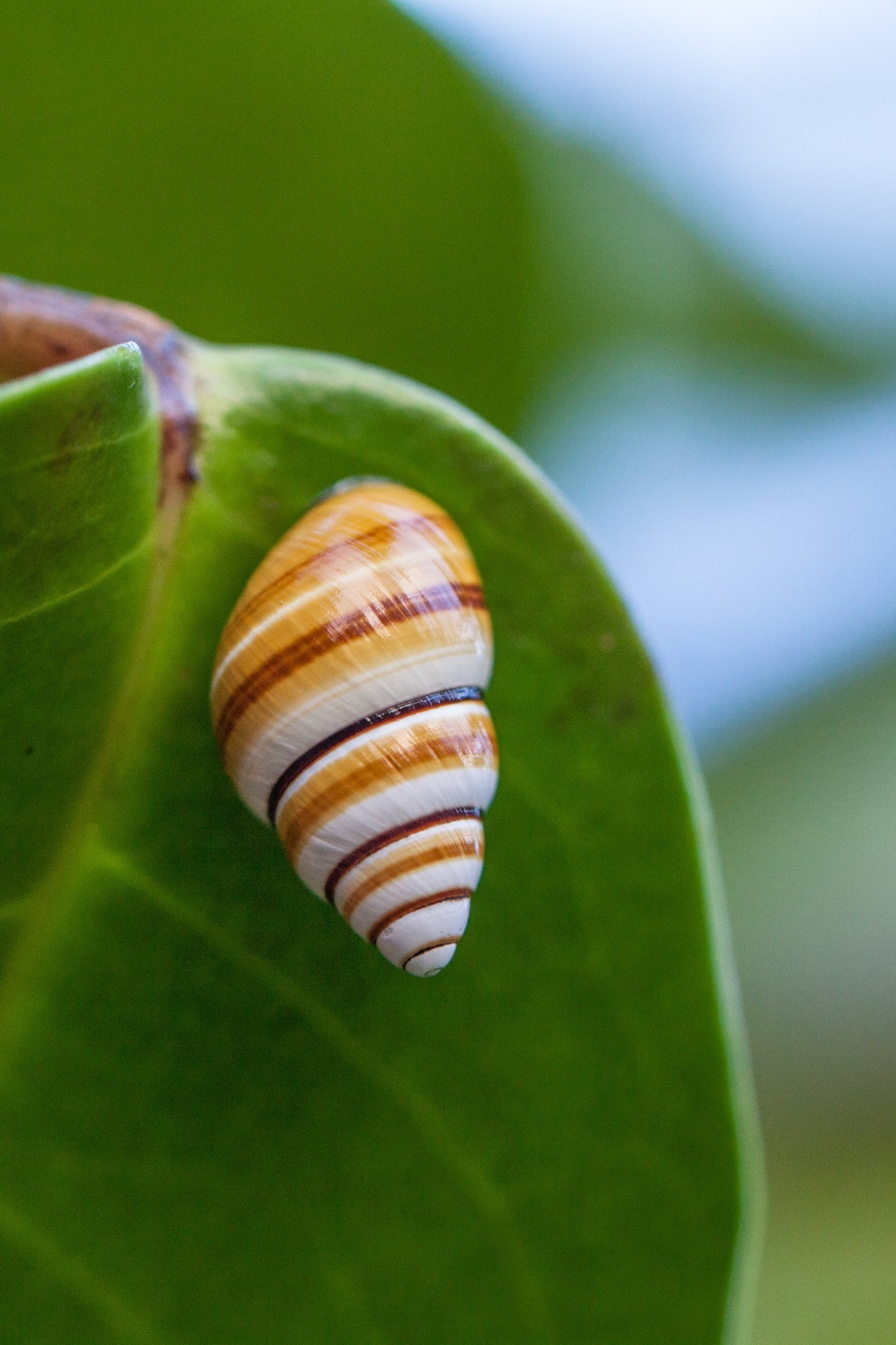

Conservation status
- Critically Endangered (IUCN 2.3)

- Critically Imperiled (NatureServe)
- CITES Appendix I

Scientific classification
- Kingdom: Animalia
- Phylum: Mollusca
- Class: Gastropoda
- Order: Stylommatophora
- Family: Achatinellidae
- Genus: Achatinella
- Subgenus: Bulimella
- Species: A. decipiens

Binomial name
- Achatinella decipiens Newcomb, 1854

Synonyms
- Achatinella corrugata Gulick; Achatinella torrida Gulick; Achatinella planospira Pfeiffer

= Achatinella decipiens =

Species of gastropod

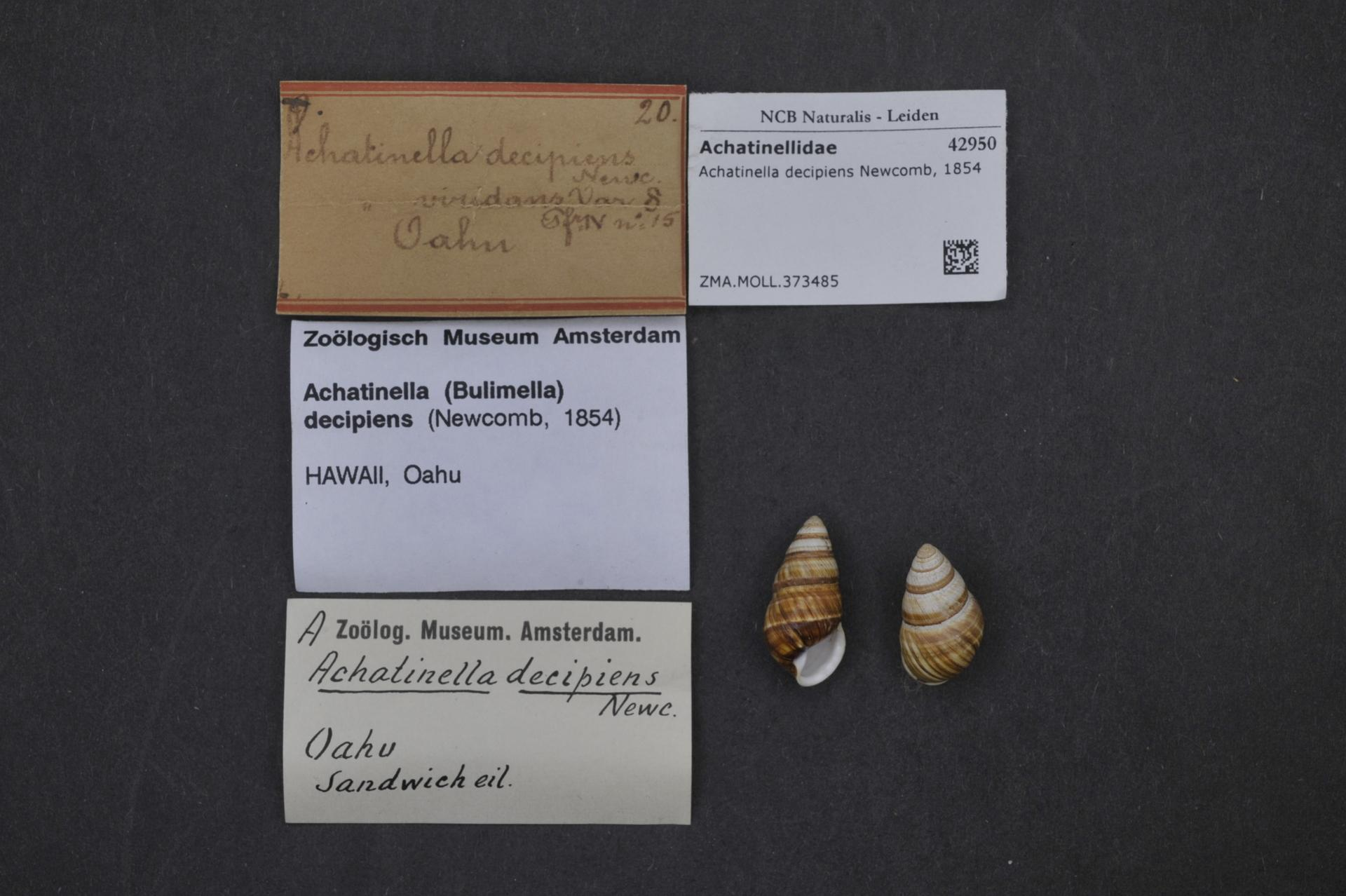

Achatinella decipiens is a species of air-breathing land snail, a terrestrial pulmonate gastropod mollusk in the family Achatinellidae. This species is endemic to Hawaii.

Cooke considered Achatinella decipiens to be a subspecies of Achatinella byronii.

== Shell description ==
The rough sinistral (eastern range) or smooth dextral (western range) shell is conically elongate, solid, slightly rounded, and margined above. The shell has six whorls. The aperture is elongately-ovate and the lip is subreflected. The columella is short, obliquely twisted and has an expanded callus. The suture is slightly impressed with numerous longitudinal, oblique striae. Shell color is white with yellow transverse bands, or yellow with white transverse lines and longitudinal chestnut colored stripes.

The height of the shell is 20.5 mm. The width of the shell is 9.0 mm.
