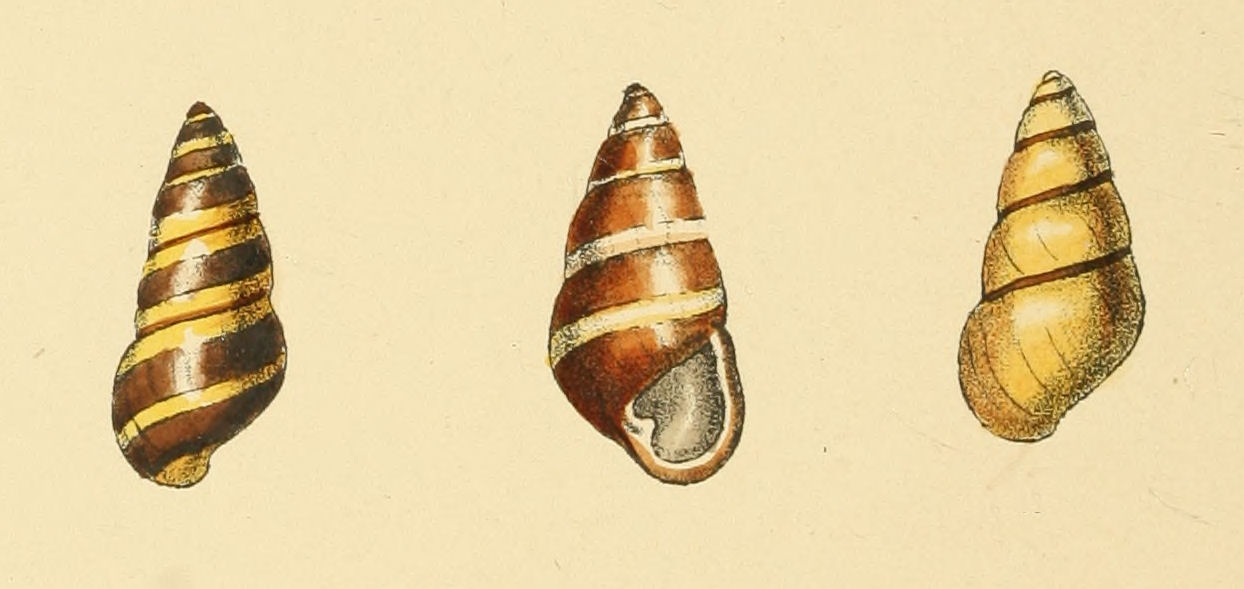
- Color morphs of A. pulcherrima
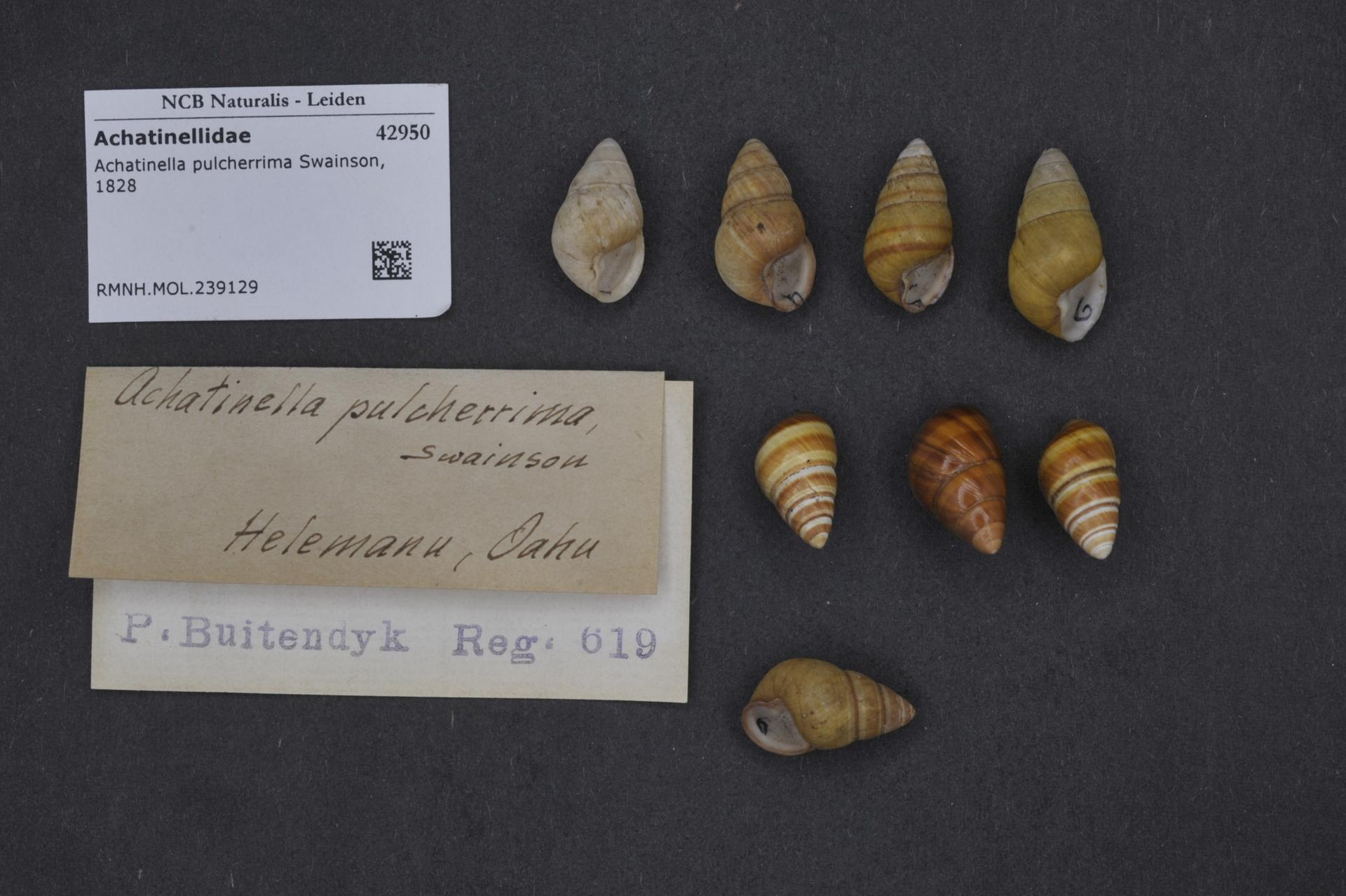
- Shells of A. pulcherrima

Conservation status
- Critically Endangered (IUCN 2.3)

- Critically Imperiled (NatureServe)
- CITES Appendix I

Scientific classification
- Kingdom: Animalia
- Phylum: Mollusca
- Class: Gastropoda
- Order: Stylommatophora
- Family: Achatinellidae
- Genus: Achatinella
- Subgenus: Bulimella
- Species: A. pulcherrima

Binomial name
- Achatinella pulcherrima Swainson, 1828

Synonyms
- Achatinella lorata Férussac, Reeve; Achatinella melanostoma Newcomb; Achatinella multicolor Pfeiffer; Achatinella mahogani Gulick; Bulimella pulcherrima Lyons

= Achatinella pulcherrima =

Species of gastropod

Achatinella pulcherrima is a species of air-breathing land snail, a terrestrial pulmonate gastropod mollusk in the family Achatinellidae. This species is endemic to the island of Oahu in Hawaii.

Henry Augustus Pilsbry considered this species to be a subspecies of Achatinella byronii.

== Shell description ==
The dextral shell is ovate oblong, subcylindrical and slender. Some specimens are more ventricose than other. The shell has six whorls. The color is white or yellow with none to several broad bands of chestnut. The margin of the lip is brown. The ground color is a deep and rich chestnut, with from one to three bands of orange, yellow, fulvous or white. The marginal groove to the suture is very close and distinct in all.

The height of the shell is 20.0 mm. The width of the shell is 11.2 mm.
