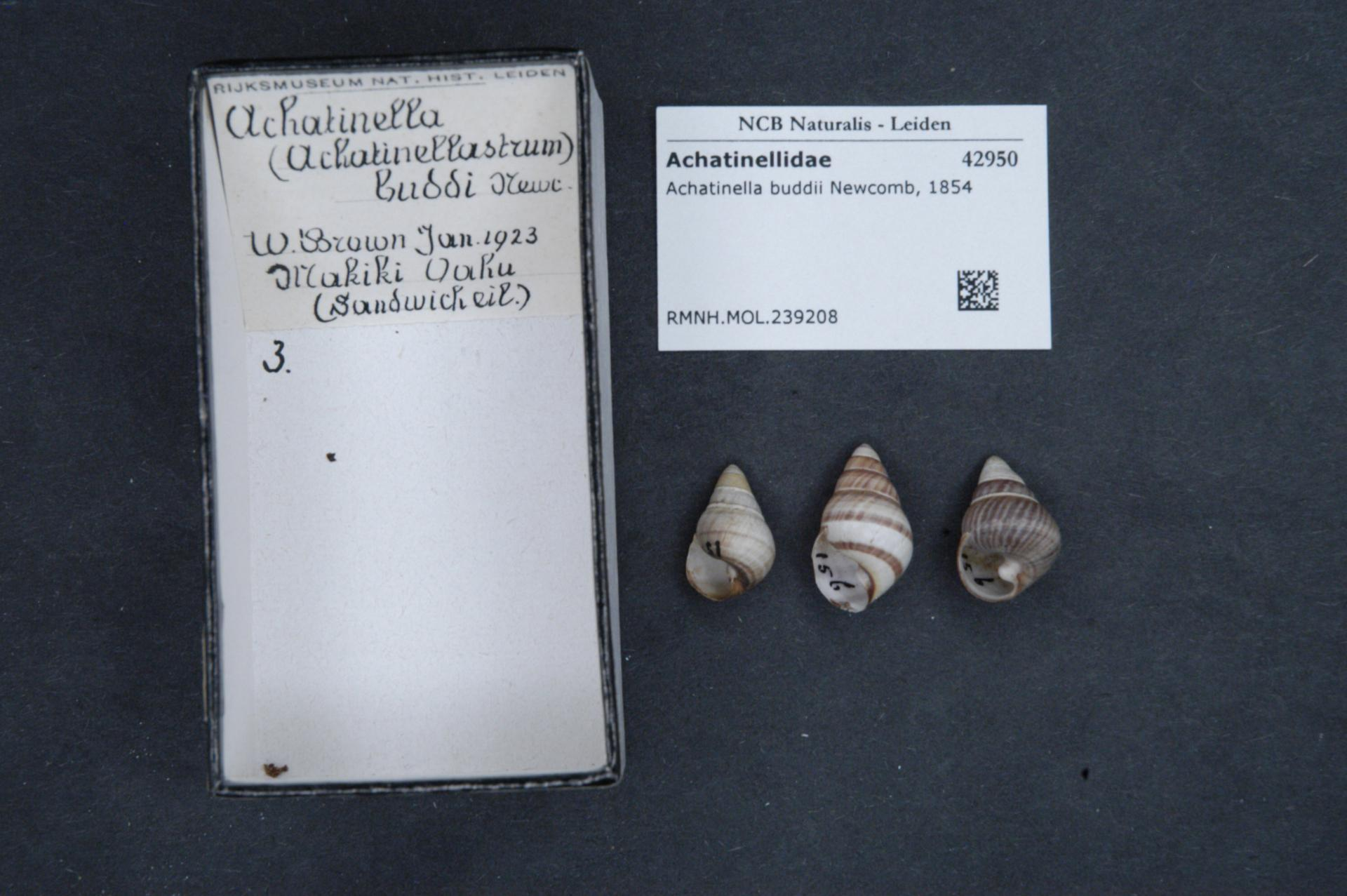
- Achatinella buddii shells

Conservation status
- Extinct (IUCN 2.3)

- Presumed Extinct (NatureServe)
- CITES Appendix I

Scientific classification
- Kingdom: Animalia
- Phylum: Mollusca
- Class: Gastropoda
- Order: Stylommatophora
- Family: Achatinellidae
- Genus: Achatinella
- Subgenus: Achatinellastrum
- Species: †A. buddii

Binomial name
- †Achatinella buddii Newcomb, 1853
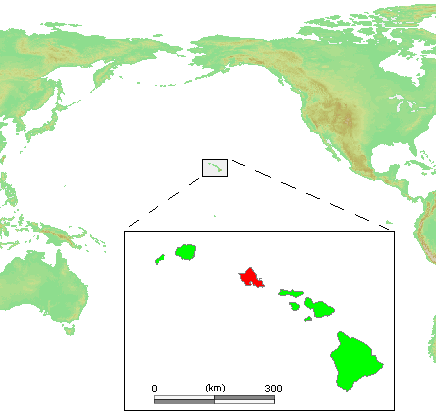
- Location of Oʻahu

= Achatinella buddii =

Extinct species of gastropod

Achatinella buddii is an extinct species of land snail, a gastropod in the family Achatinellidae. It was endemic to Oʻahu.
