= Achatinella phaeozona =

Conservation status
- Critically Endangered (IUCN 2.3)

- Possibly Extinct (NatureServe)
- CITES Appendix I

Scientific classification
- Kingdom: Animalia
- Phylum: Mollusca
- Class: Gastropoda
- Order: Stylommatophora
- Family: Achatinellidae
- Genus: Achatinella
- Subgenus: Achatinellastrum
- Species: A. phaeozona

Binomial name
- Achatinella phaeozona Gulick, 1856

Species of gastropod

Achatinella phaeozona is a species of air-breathing tree snail, an arboreal pulmonate gastropod mollusc in the family Achatinellidae. This species is endemic to Hawaii.
