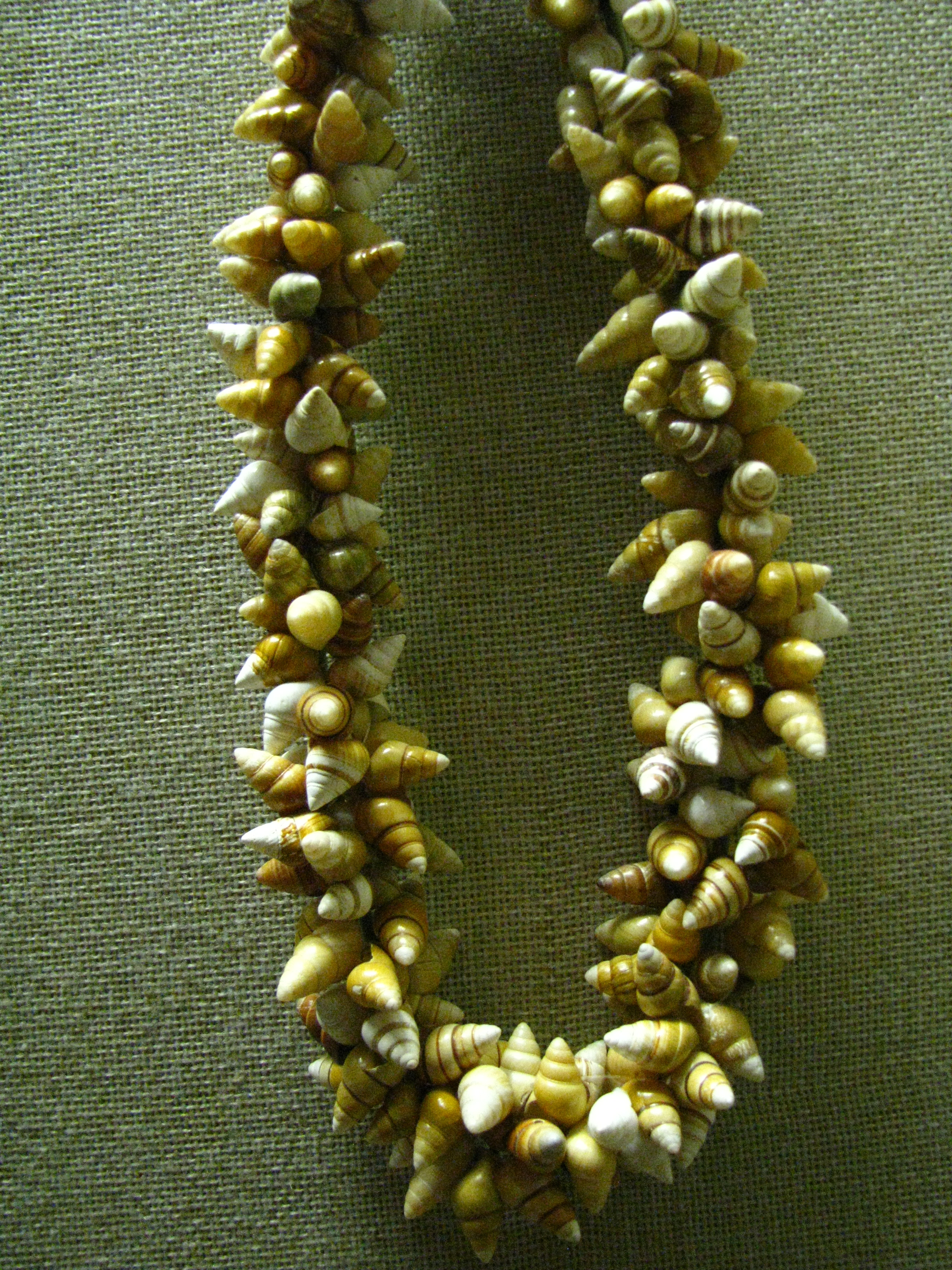
- A lei made of Achatinella vulpina shells

Conservation status
- Critically Endangered (IUCN 2.3)

- Possibly Extinct (NatureServe)
- CITES Appendix I

Scientific classification
- Kingdom: Animalia
- Phylum: Mollusca
- Class: Gastropoda
- Order: Stylommatophora
- Family: Achatinellidae
- Genus: Achatinella
- Subgenus: Achatinellastrum
- Species: A. vulpina

Binomial name
- Achatinella vulpina (Férussac, 1824)

= Achatinella vulpina =

Species of gastropod

Achatinella vulpina is a species of air-breathing land snail, a terrestrial pulmonate gastropod mollusc in the family Achatinellidae. This species is endemic to Hawaii.

== Shell description ==
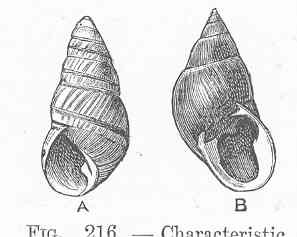
Left: Achatinella vulpina, right: Partula planilabrum

The dextral or sinistral shell is ovate-conic, and colored glossy yellow, green, olive or chestnut; often banded with green or chestnut. The shell has 6 1/4 whorls. The color pattern is extremely variable.

The height of the shell is 19.0 mm. The width of the shell is 10.0 mm.
