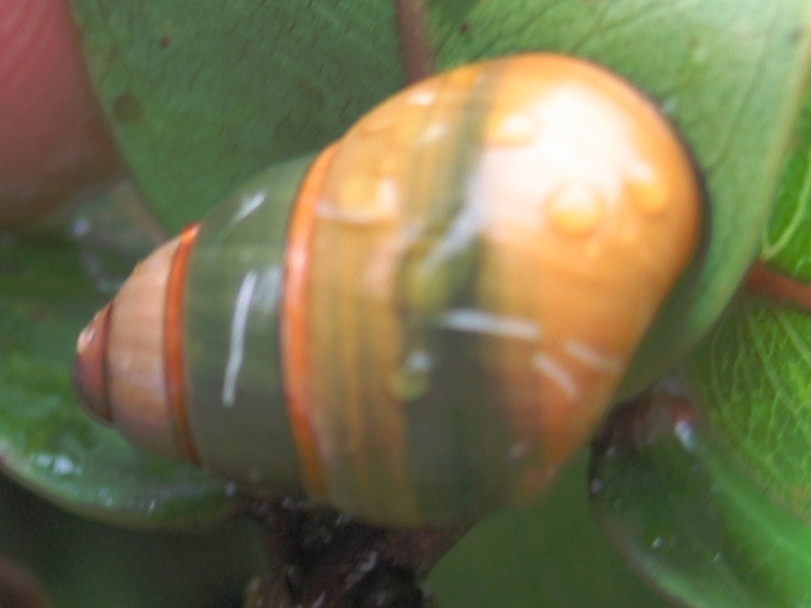

Conservation status
- Critically Endangered (IUCN 2.3)

- Critically Imperiled (NatureServe)
- CITES Appendix I

Scientific classification
- Kingdom: Animalia
- Phylum: Mollusca
- Class: Gastropoda
- Order: Stylommatophora
- Family: Achatinellidae
- Genus: Achatinella
- Subgenus: Bulimella
- Species: A. lila

Binomial name
- Achatinella lila Pilsbry, 1914

= Achatinella lila =

Species of land snail

Achatinella lila is a species of air-breathing land snail, a terrestrial pulmonate gastropod mollusk in the family Achatinellidae. This species is endemic to the northern Ko'olau Mountains, Oahu.

== Shell description ==
Its shells are glossy, colorful yellow and green.

The shell is sinistral, ovate-conic, thin but strong, nearly smooth, brilliantly glossy. The shell has 5.5 whorls. The embryonic whorls are burnt sienna brown (weathering to whitish in adult shells), or sometimes there is a light median zone. The last whorl has either a uniform blackish chestnut, or a chestnut peripheral band and baso-columellar patch on a yellow ground, or like the last but with a green band midway between periphery and suture, or with sutural and peripheral bands and a baso-columellar patch of yellow on a chestnut ground. There are also a few specimens more or less intermediate between these patterns.

The aperture is moderately oblique, and colored white or faintly lilac within. The peristome is acute, and slightly or not thickened within. The columellar fold is strong, and is colored purple or white.

The height of the shell is 17.0 mm. The width of the shell is 11.0 mm.

== Conservation ==
Achatinella lila is the first Hawaiian achatinelline to be reintroduced from captive stocks, a significant milestone in the conservation of the endemic gastropod fauna of the islands. Achatinellines have long generation lengths, caused by slow maturity (5 years) and reproductive rates (1-7 offspring per year depending on the species). The snails also have significantly long lifespans (>10 years), making these species particularly prone to population declines as a result of invasive predators, habitat alteration, and over-collection. Prior to the modern reintroductions, the species was limited to a single wild population in the Ko'olau Mountains of Oahu. Six snails from the imperiled population were taken in 1997, and along with their offspring were grown until introductions were possible, in numbers of 50 snails per cohort. Frequent photograph-based identification monitoring occurs, along with searches for shells of dead individuals. Future conservation measures include continued monitoring and augmentation of the current population with new cohorts.
