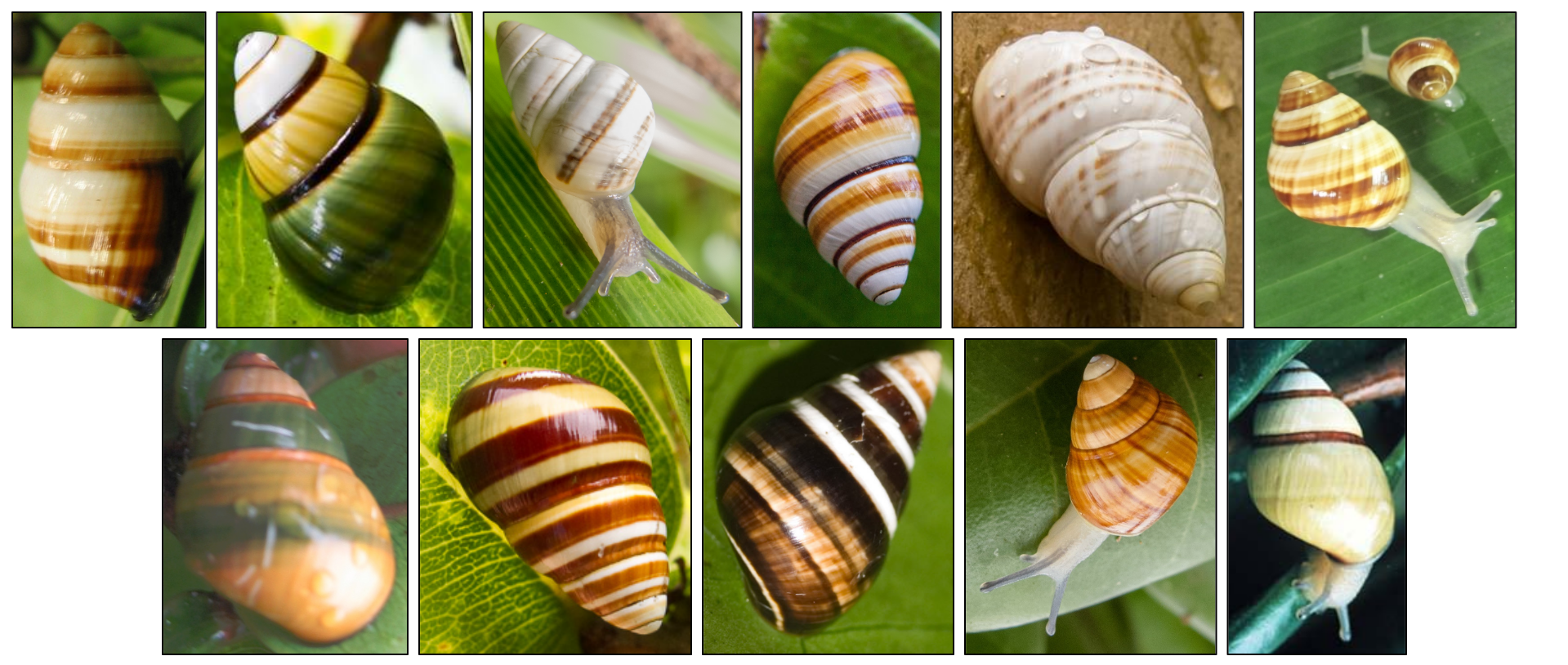
- Extant species of Achatinella. Left to right, top to bottom: A. bulimoides, A. byronii, A. concavospira, A. decipiens, A. fulgens, A. fuscobasis, A. lila, A. livida, A. mustelina, A. pupukanioe, A. sowerbyana

Conservation status
- CITES Appendix I

Scientific classification
- Kingdom: Animalia
- Phylum: Mollusca
- Class: Gastropoda
- Order: Stylommatophora
- Family: Achatinellidae
- Subfamily: Achatinellinae; Gulick, 1873
- Genus: Achatinella; Swainson, 1828

Diversity
- 41 species, 9 extant species remained in 2014

Synonyms
- Achatinella (Achatinella) Swainson, 1828 · alternate representation; Achatinella (Achatinellastrum) L. Pfeiffer, 1854 · alternate representation; Achatinella (Apex) E. von Martens, 1860 (junior synonym); Achatinella (Bulimella) L. Pfeiffer, 1854· alternate representation; Achatinellastrum L. Pfeiffer, 1854 superseded rank; Apex E. von Martens, 1860 junior subjective synonym; Bulimella L. Pfeiffer, 1854; Bulimus (Helicteres) H. Beck, 1837 (invalid; placed on the Official Index by Opinion 2017); Cochlogena (Helicteres) A. Férussac, 1821 unavailable name (an infra-generic name within Helix (Cochlogena) proposed as a nominitive pleural); Helicter Pease, 1862 (invalid: unjustified emendation...); Helicterella Gulick, 1873 nomen nudum; Helicteres A. Férussac, 1821 (unavailable name - a genus-level name within Helix (Cochlogena) as a nominitive pleural)

= Achatinella =

Genus of tree snails

Achatinella is a tropical genus of colorful land snails in the monotypic Achatinellidae subfamily Achatinellinae.

Species are arboreal pulmonate gastropod mollusks with some species called Oʻahu tree snails or kāhuli in the Hawaiian language.

Achatinella species are all endemic to the island of Oahu in Hawaii, and all remaining extant species are endangered. They were once abundant and were mentioned extensively in Hawaiian folklore and songs, and their shells were used in lei and other ornaments.

Many of the species are sinistral or left-handed chirality in their spiral shell coiling, whereas most gastropod shells are dextral, with a right handed spiral.

== Distribution ==
There were 41 species of Achatinella endemic to the Hawaiian island of Oʻahu, though only 13 species survive. Some species have less than 50 remaining individuals, and others have +300; many species fall in between.

== Conservation status ==
All 13 species are listed under United States federal legislation as endangered. The IUCN lists a number of Achatinella species as extinct and the remainder as critically endangered. Invasive species such as Norway rats, Jackson's chameleons, and the highly predatory snail Euglandina rosea have been involved in the extinctions and declines of the native tree snails.

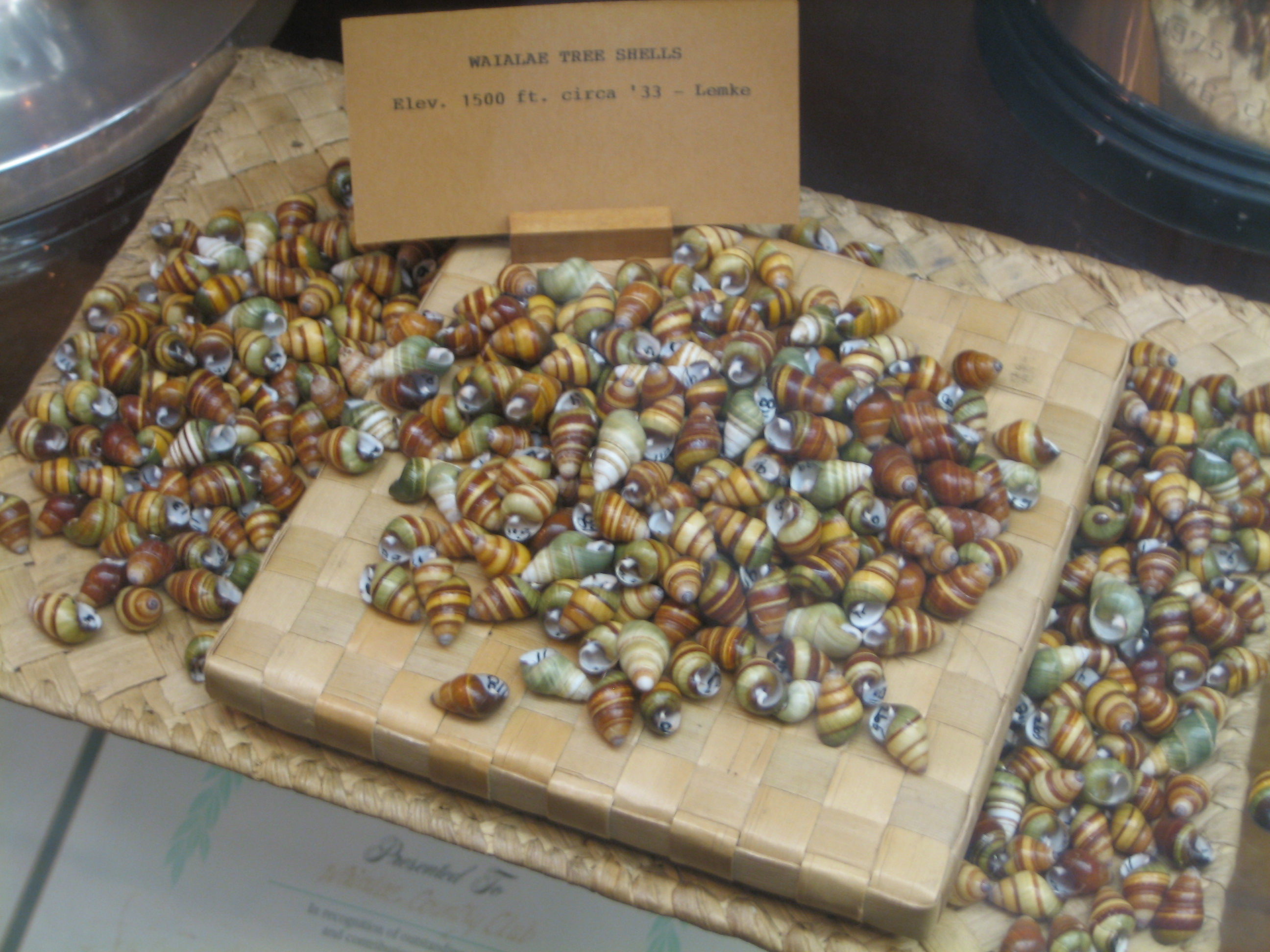
O'ahu tree snail shells collected ca. 1933 at an elevation of 1500 feet on Waialae Ridge in Waialae Country Club, Honolulu, Hawaii.

== Shell description ==
Achatinella species shells are diverse in patterns, colors, and shapes, but all average about 0.75 in (1.9 cm) in length. Most have smooth glossy, and oblong or ovate shells which show a variety of colors, including yellow, orange, red, brown, green, gray, black, and rainbow.

There are three recognized subgenera within the genus Achatinella. Subgenera are distinguished according to shells characteristics only.

Genus Achatinella Swainson, 1828: The dextral or sinistral shell is imperforate or minutely perforate, oblong, ovate or globose-conic; smooth or longitudinally corrugated, with only weak traces of spiral sculpture. Shell color is in spiral bands or streaks in the direction of the growth lines. The lip is simple or thickened within and sometimes slightly expanding. The columella bears a strong callous fold. Type species of the genus Achatinella is Achatinella apexfulva (Dixon).

Subgenus Bulimella Pfeiffer, 1854: Shell shape is oblong-conic or ovate. The spire is obtuse, rounded or convexly-conic near the apex. The outer lip is thickened by a strong callous rib within the aperture (except in Achatinella abbreviata and Achatinella lila). Type species of the subgenus Bulimella is Achatinella byronii Newcomb.

Subgenus Achatinellastrum Pfeiffer, 1854: The shell is imperforate, ovate-conic or oblong-conic and smooth. The embryonic whorls are not flattened. The outer lip is thin or only slightly thickened within the apex but not expanded. These are the most generally distributed of the Achatinella species and show a prolific area of intergrading color patterns. Type species of the subgenus Achatinellastrum is Achatinella stewartii (Green, 1827).

== Ecology ==
=== Habitat ===
These snails live in trees. Currently they are only found in mountainous dry to moist forests and shrublands above 1,300 ft (400 m). Most individuals spend their entire life on just one tree.

=== Feeding ===
These tree snails are nocturnal, and feed by grazing fungus which grows on the surface of native plant leaves.

Although these tree snails are occasionally found on introduced plants, it is unknown whether or not the fungus which grows on these plants can provide long-term support for healthy breeding populations of these snails.

In captivity Achatinella feed on fungus growing on leaves of Metrosideros polymorpha. They also feed on cornstarch, which can be spread in terraria with water and on cultures of sooty mold grown on laboratory agar. In captivity, cuttlebone is used as a source for calcium.

=== Life cycle ===
Adult snails are hermaphroditic (having both male and female reproductive organs) and can live for many years. These are live bearing snails (give birth to live snails instead of laying eggs).

=== Predation and other threats ===
Because growth rate and fertility are very low, these snails are especially vulnerable to loss of individuals through human collection, through predation, or because of other disturbances.

The most serious threats to the survival of Oʻahu tree snails are predation by the introduced carnivorous snail Euglandina rosea, by rats (Rattus exulans, Rattus norvegicus, Rattus rattus), and loss of habitat due to the spread of non-native vegetation into higher elevation forests.

An additional threat is Jackson's chameleon (Trioceros jacksonii) that were introduced to Hawaii in the early 1970s are a serious threat to Achatinella, because the chameleons directly prey on them and other snails species. Other predators of Achatinella include the land planarian Platydemus manokwari.

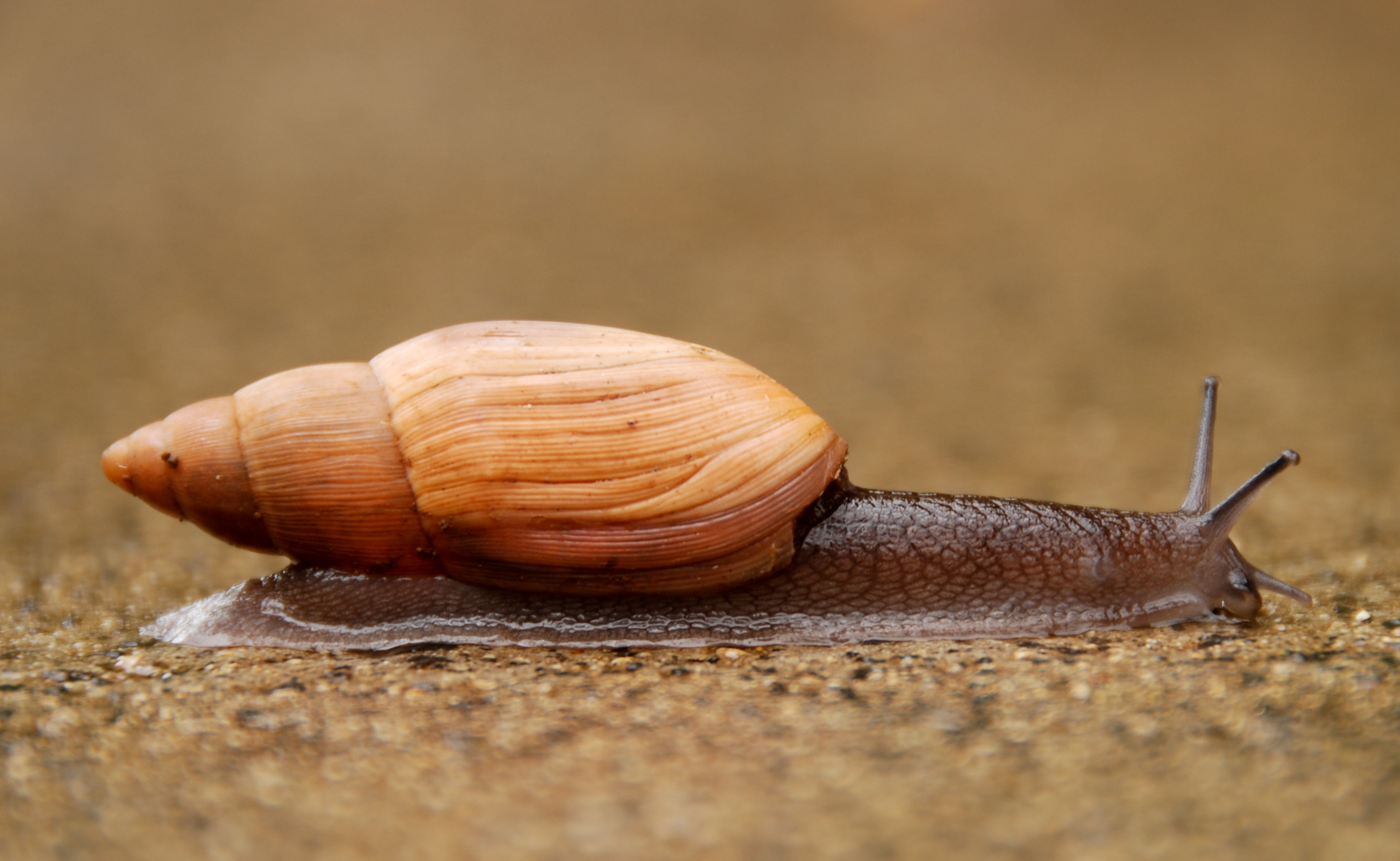
Euglandina rosea

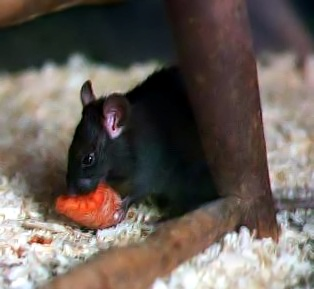
Black rat

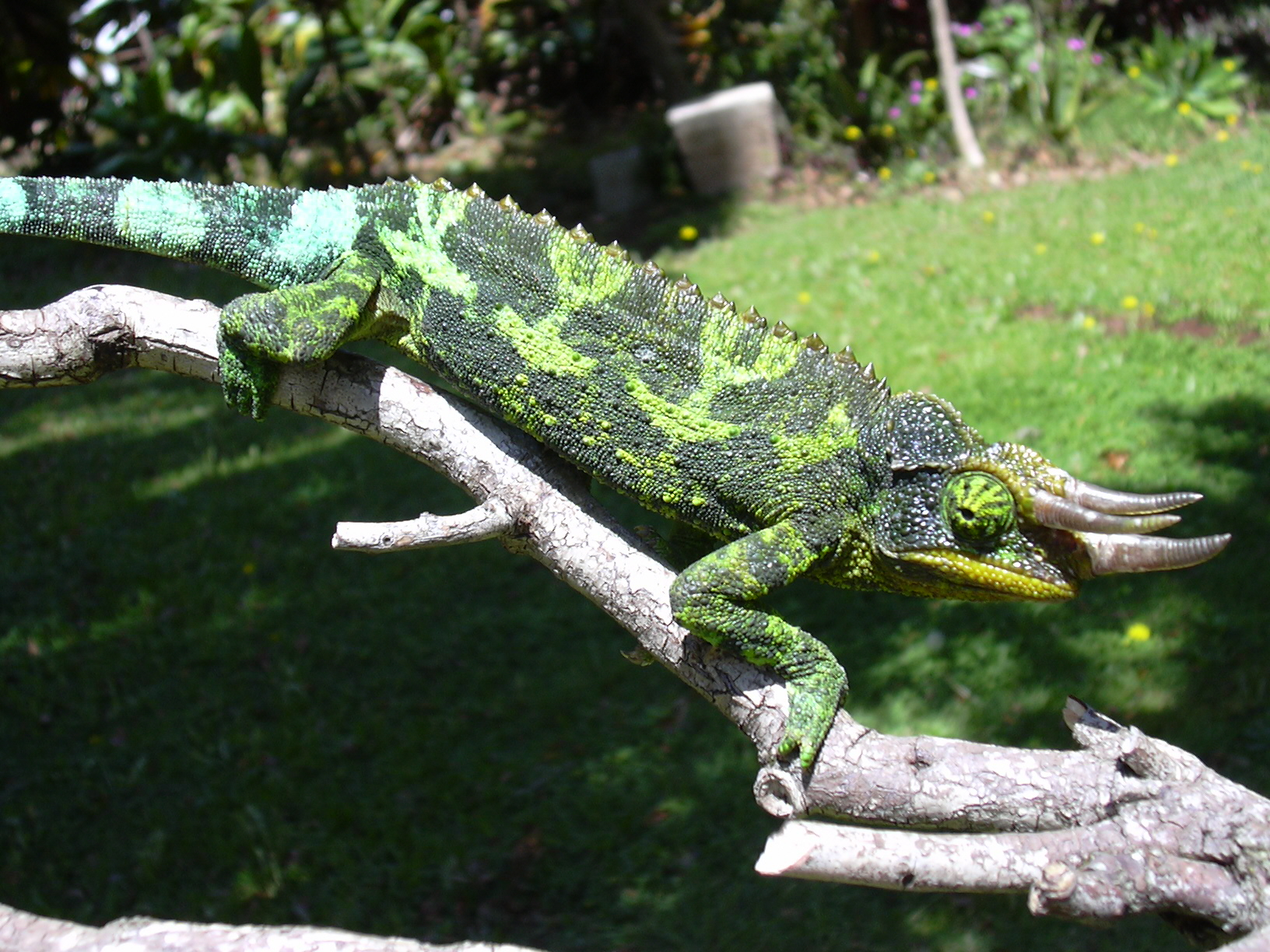
Jackson's chameleon

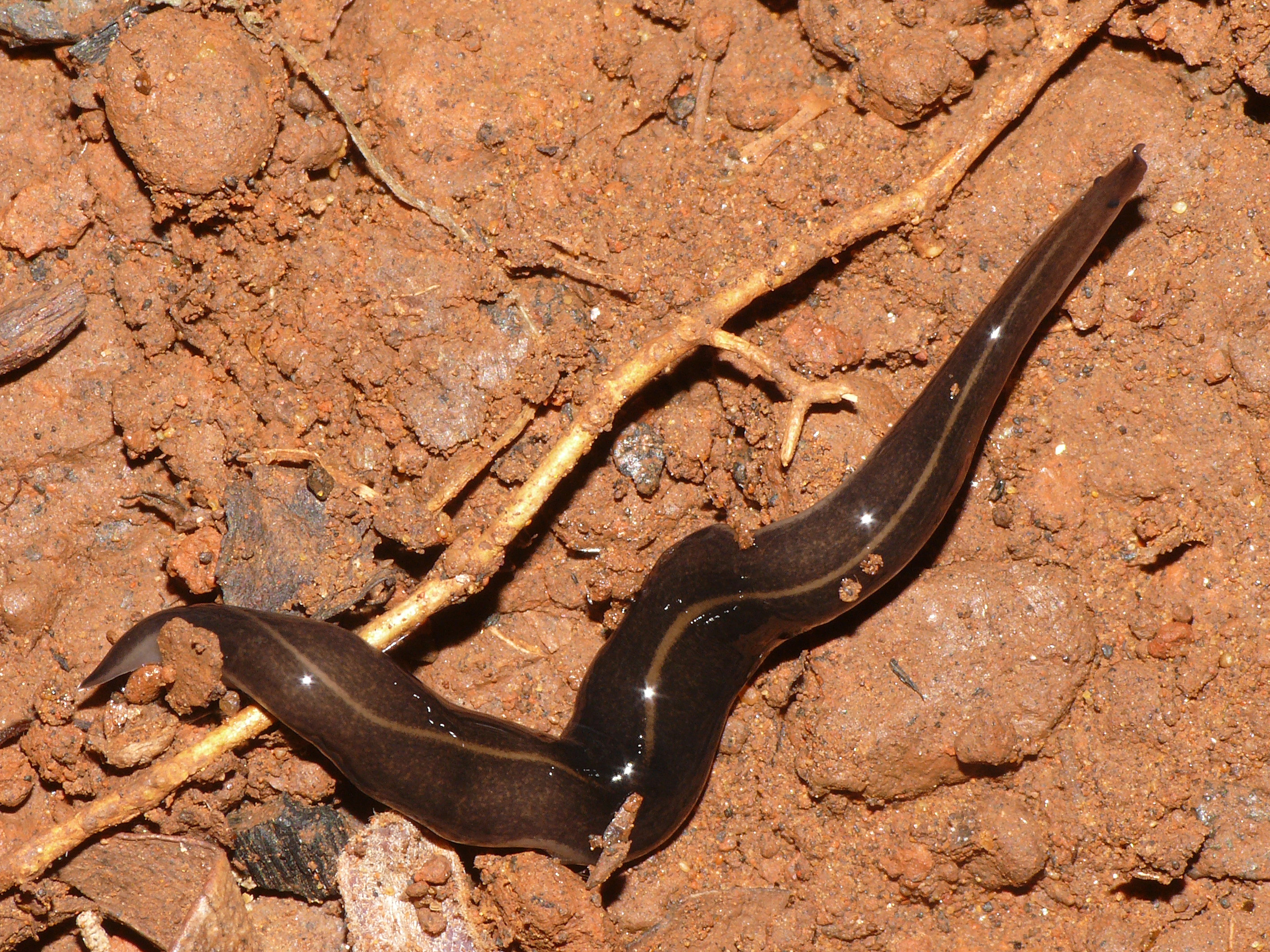
Platydemus manokwari

== Hawaiian folklore ==
According to Ancient Hawaiian folklore, the kāhuli are known as the pūpū kani oe, which translates to "shell that sounds long" or the "singing shell". They are believed to be able vocalize and sing at night. Experts have attributed this association to the chirping of crickets at night when the snails are active. Native Hawaiians used the shells of the snails to create kahuli shell lei and their status as coveted souvenirs in the 19th-century may have contributed to the decline of the species. The summer palace of King Kamehameha III was called Kaniakapupu ("the singing of the land shells") because of the many snails which once inhabited the area during his lifetime.

== Species ==
There are 41 species in the genus Achatinella, of which 10 are currently known to be extant:

=== Subgenus Achatinella ===
- †Achatinella apexfulva (Dixon, 1789)
- †Achatinella cestus Newcomb, 1853: synonym of Achatinella apexfulva cestus Newcomb, 1854 (basionym)
- Achatinella concavospira Pfeiffer, 1859
- †Achatinella decora (Férussac, 1821)
- Achatinella dolium L. Pfeiffer, 1855
- Achatinella leucorraphe (Gulick, 1873): synonym of Achatinella apexfulva leucorraphe (Gulick, 1873)
- †Achatinella lorata Férussac, 1824
- Achatinella mustelina Mighels, 1845
- Achatinella swiftii Newcomb, 1853: synonym of Achatinella turgida Newcomb, 1854
- †Achatinella turgida Newcomb, 1853
- †Achatinella valida Pfeiffer, 1855
- †Achatinella vittata Reeve, 1850

=== Subgenus Bulimella ===
- †Achatinella abbreviata Reeve, 1850
- Achatinella bulimoides Swainson, 1828
- Achatinella byronii (Wood, 1828)
- Achatinella decipiens Newcomb, 1854
- Achatinella elegans Newcomb, 1854: synonym of Achatinella bulimoides elegans Newcomb, 1854 (unaccepted > superseded combination)
- Achatinella faba L. Pfeiffer, 1859
- Achatinella fuscobasis (E. A. Smith, 1873)
- Achatinella lila Pilsbry, 1914
- †Achatinella pulcherrima Swainson, 1828
- Achatinella pupukanioe Pilsbry & Cooke, 1914
- Achatinella sowerbyana Pfeiffer, 1855
- †Achatinella taeniolata Pfeiffer, 1846
- †Achatinella viridans Mighels, 1845

=== Subgenus Achatinellastrum ===
- †Achatinella bellula E. A. Smith, 1873
- †Achatinella buddii Newcomb, 1853
- †Achatinella casta Newcomb, 1853
- †Achatinella caesia Gulick, 1858
- Achatinella curta Newcomb, 1853
- †Achatinella dimorpha Gulick, 1858
- Achatinella fulgens Newcomb, 1853
- †Achatinella juddii Baldwin, 1895
- †Achatinella juncea Gulick, 1856
- †Achatinella lehuiensis E. A. Smith, 1873
- Achatinella livida Swainson, 1828
- †Achatinella papyracea Gulick, 1856
- †Achatinella phaeozona Gulick, 1856
- Achatinella solitaria Newcomb, 1854
- †Achatinella spaldingi Pilsbry & Cooke, 1914
- †Achatinella stewartii (Green, 1827)
- †Achatinella thaanumi Pilsbry & Cooke, 1914
- †Achatinella vulpina (Férussac, 1824)

== Gallery ==
=== Extant species ===
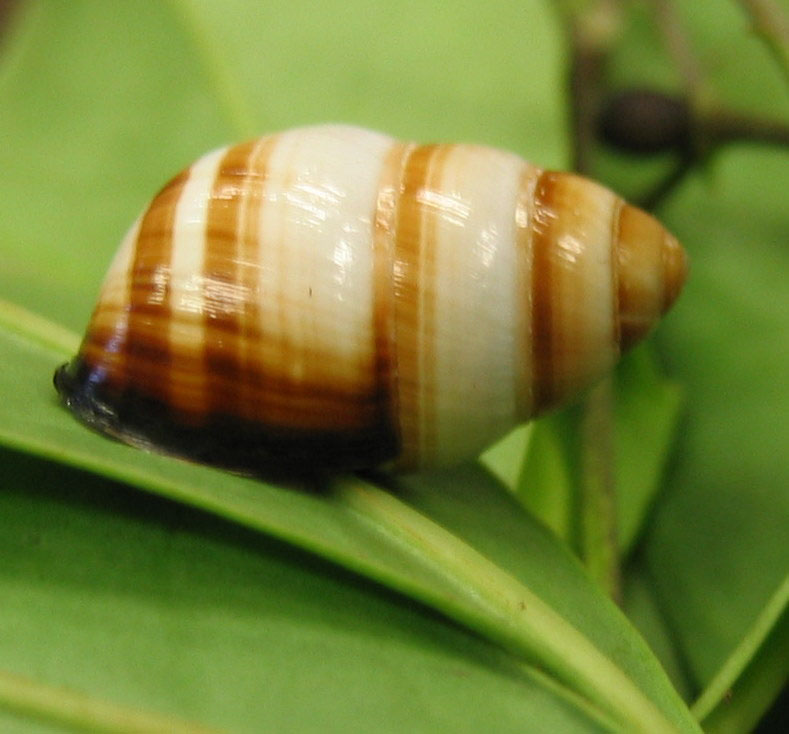
Achatinella bulimoides

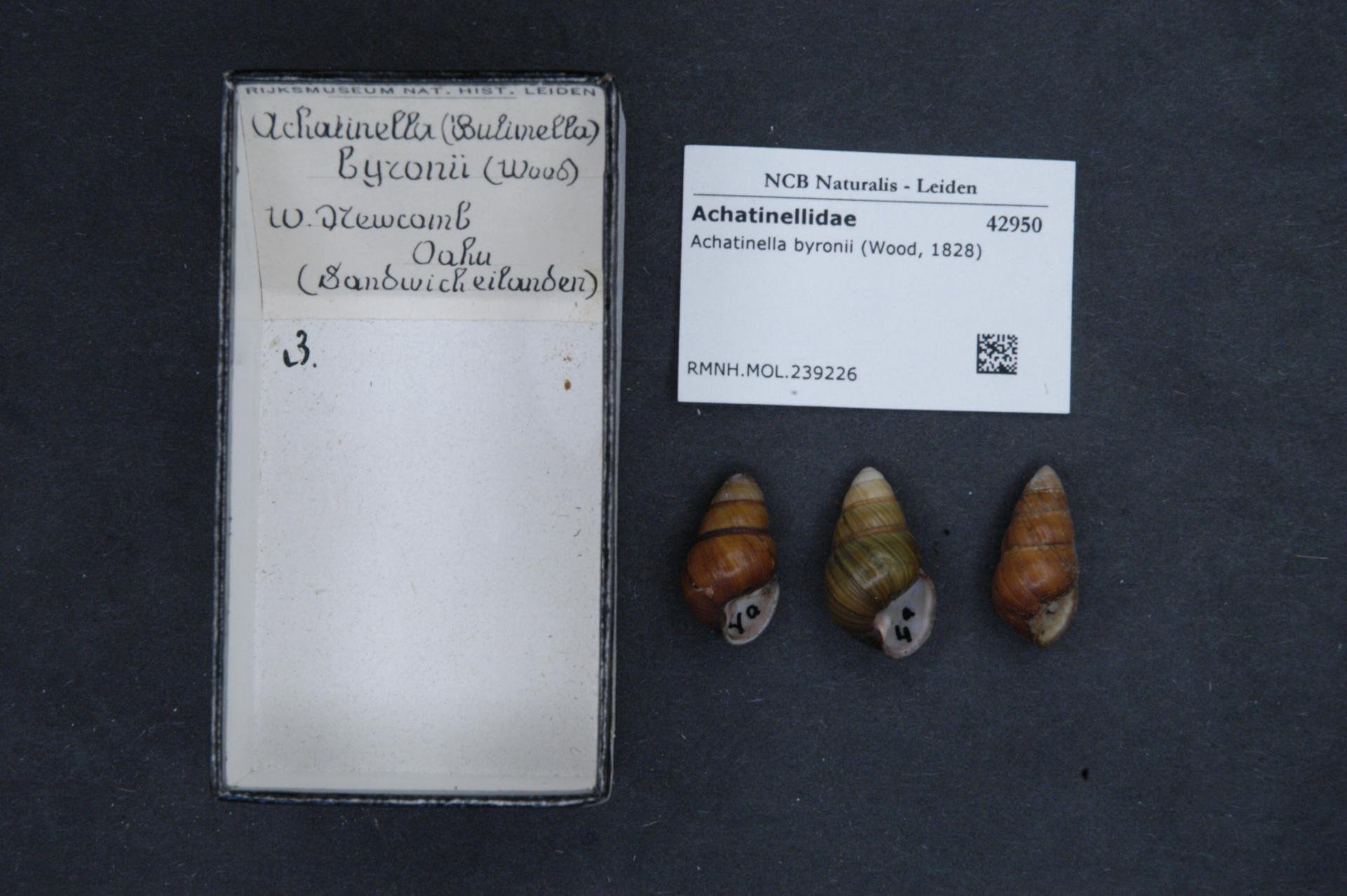
Achatinella byronii

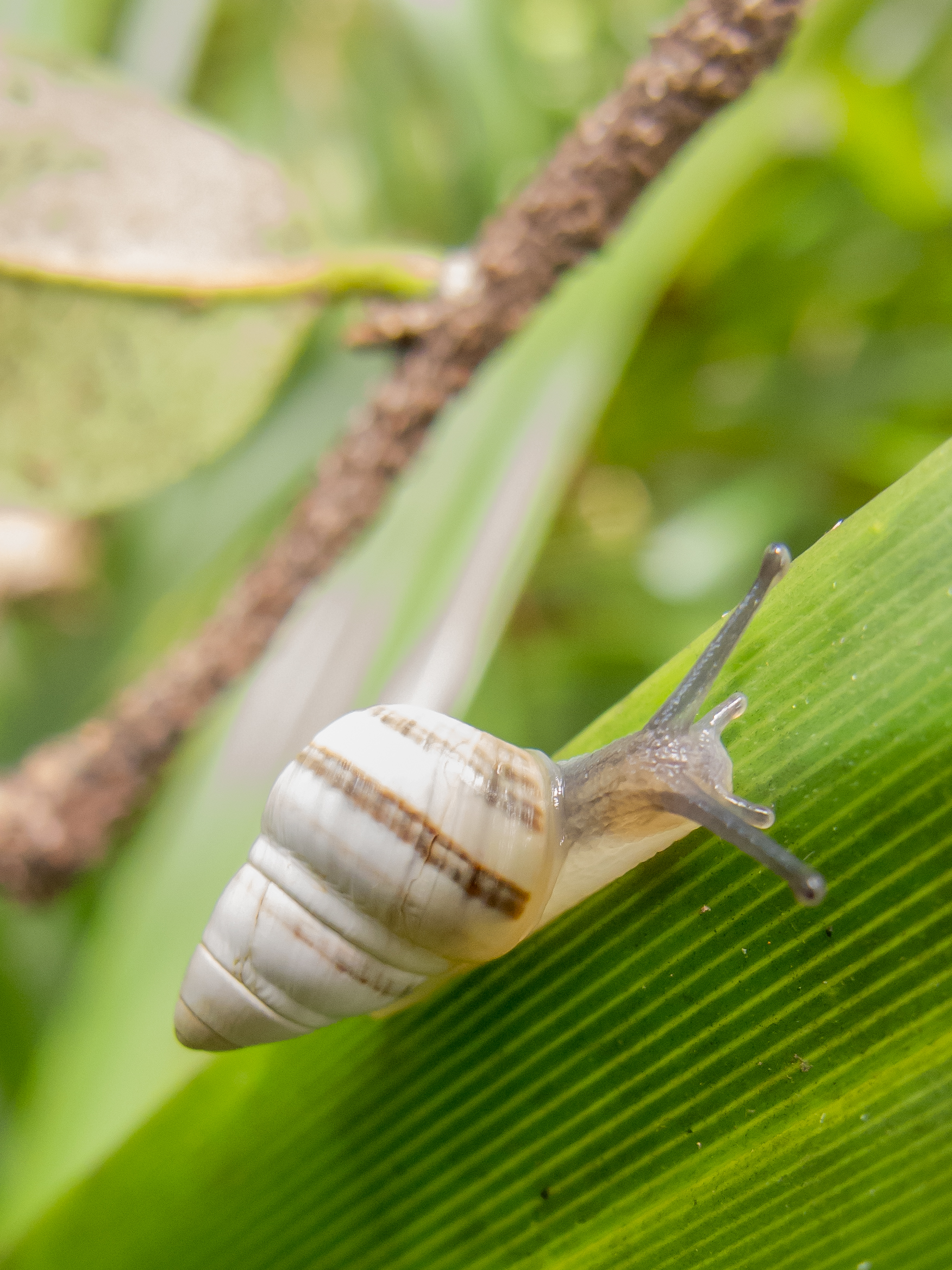
Achatinella concavospira

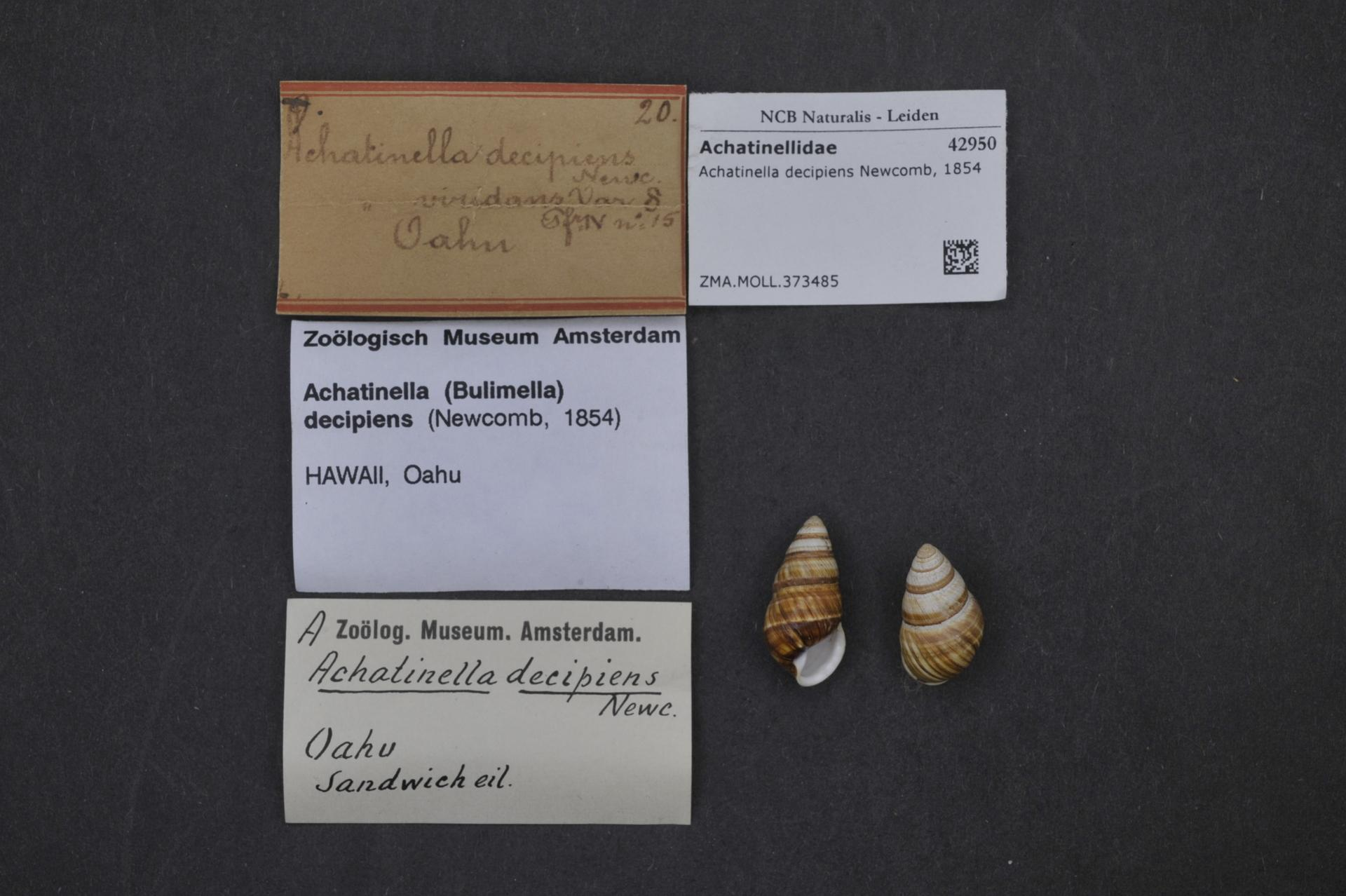
Achatinella decipiens

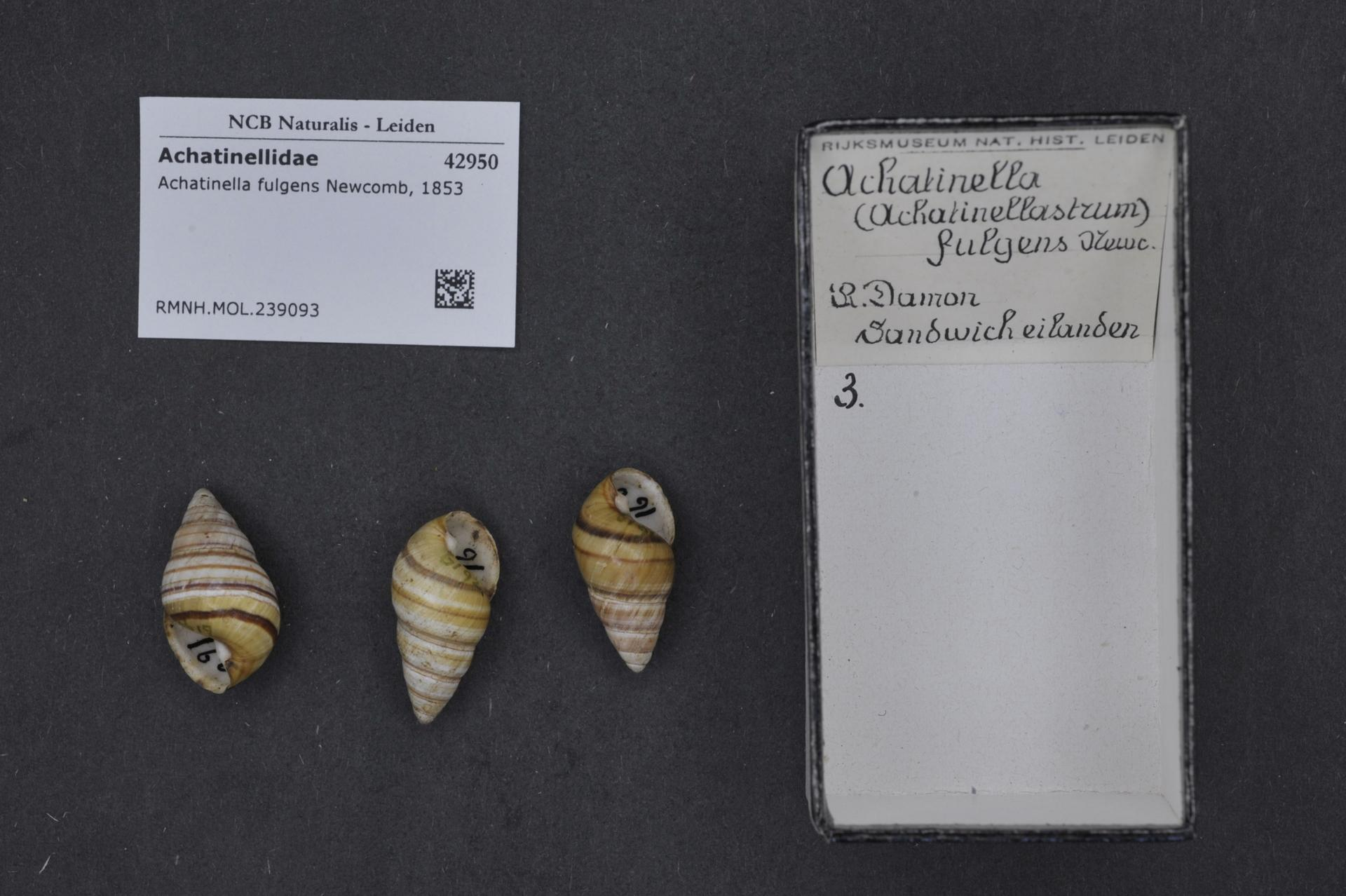
Achatinella fulgens

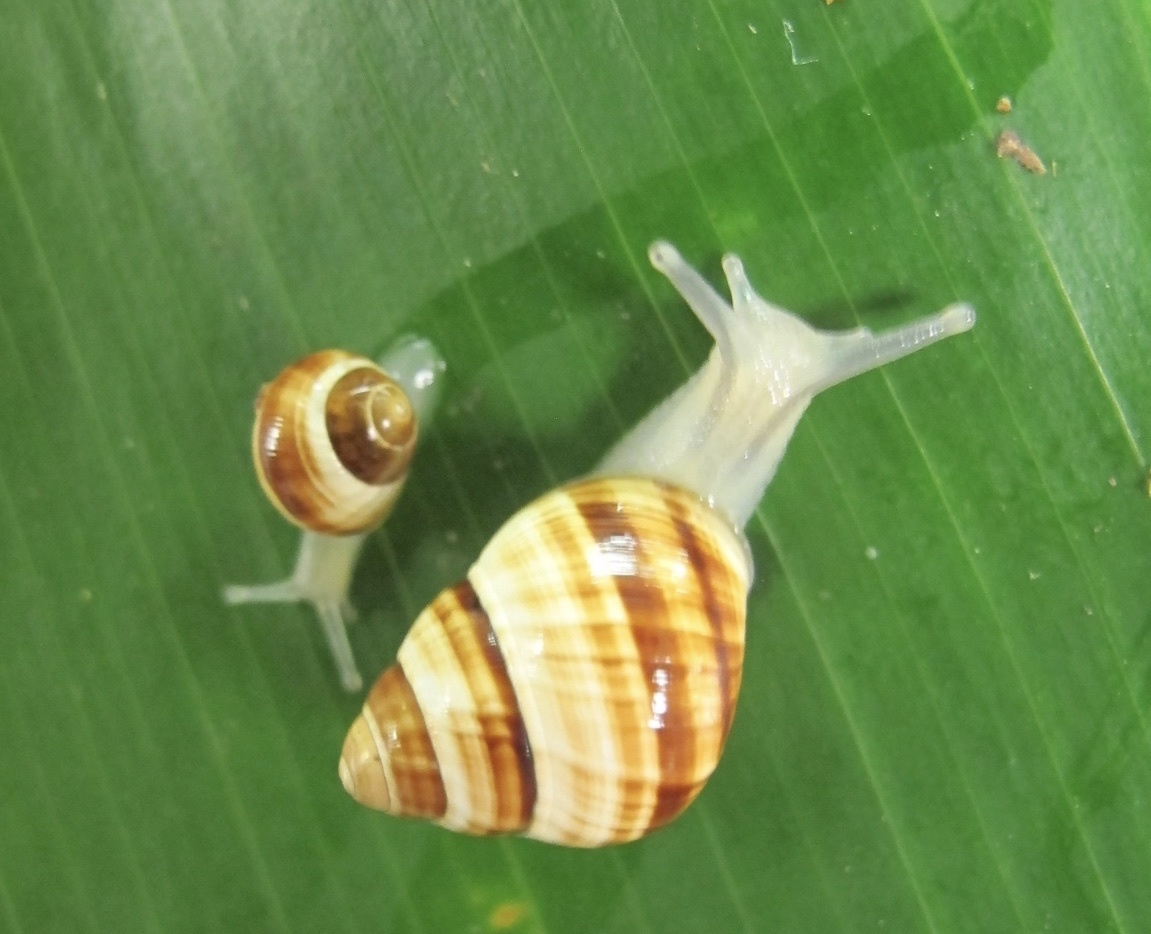
Achatinella fuscobasis

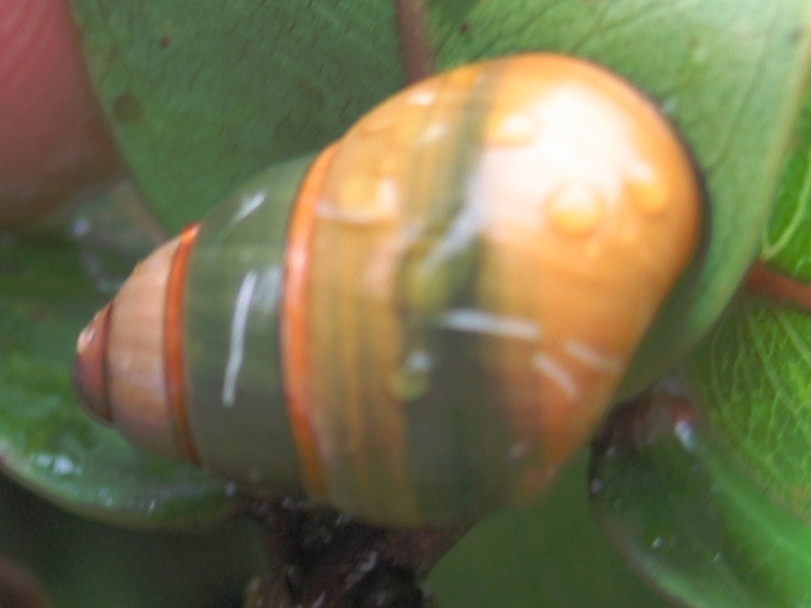
Achatinella lila

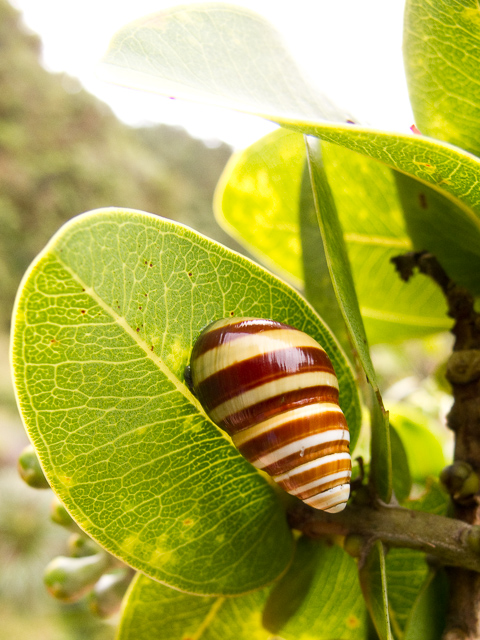
Achatinella livida

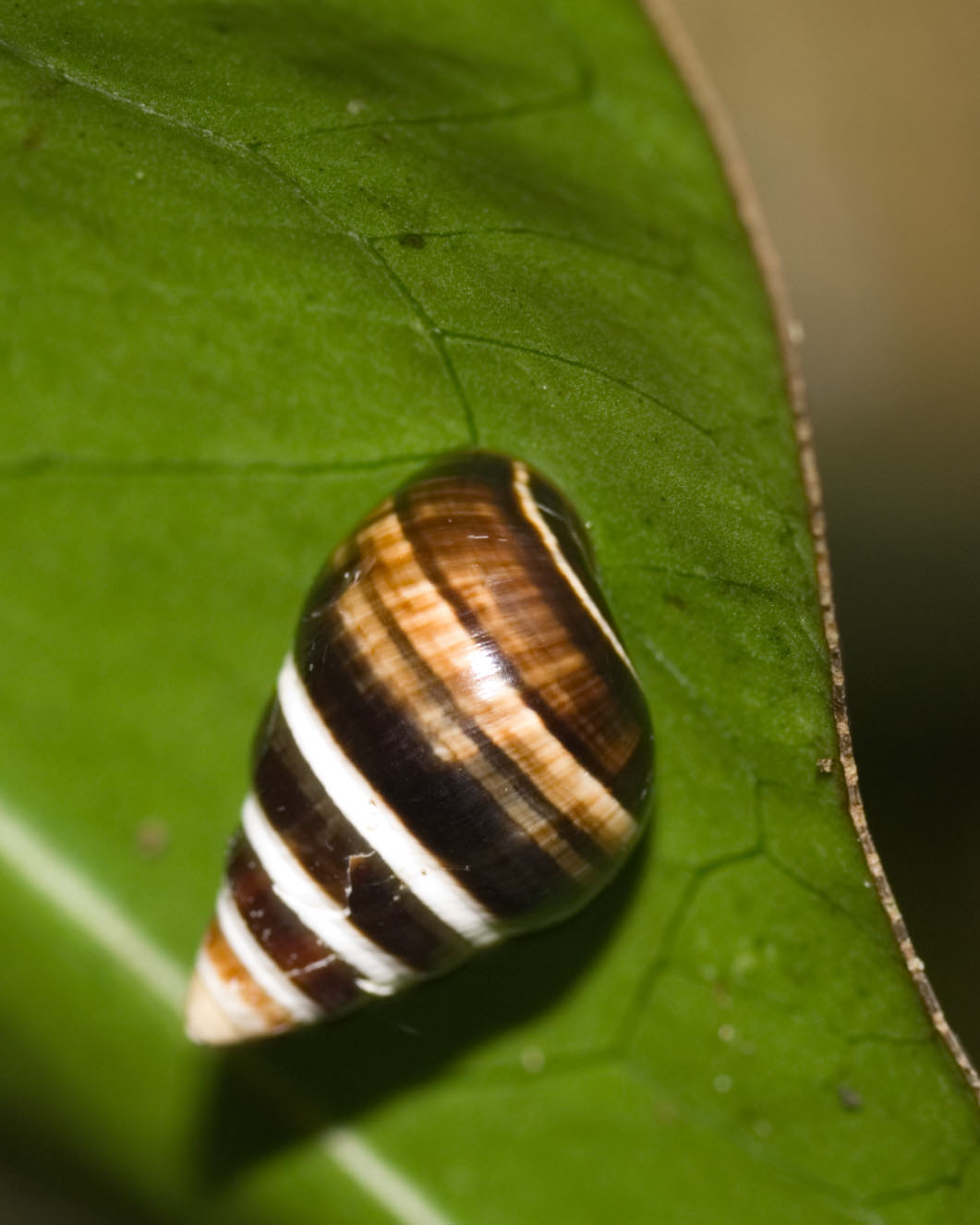
Achatinella mustelina

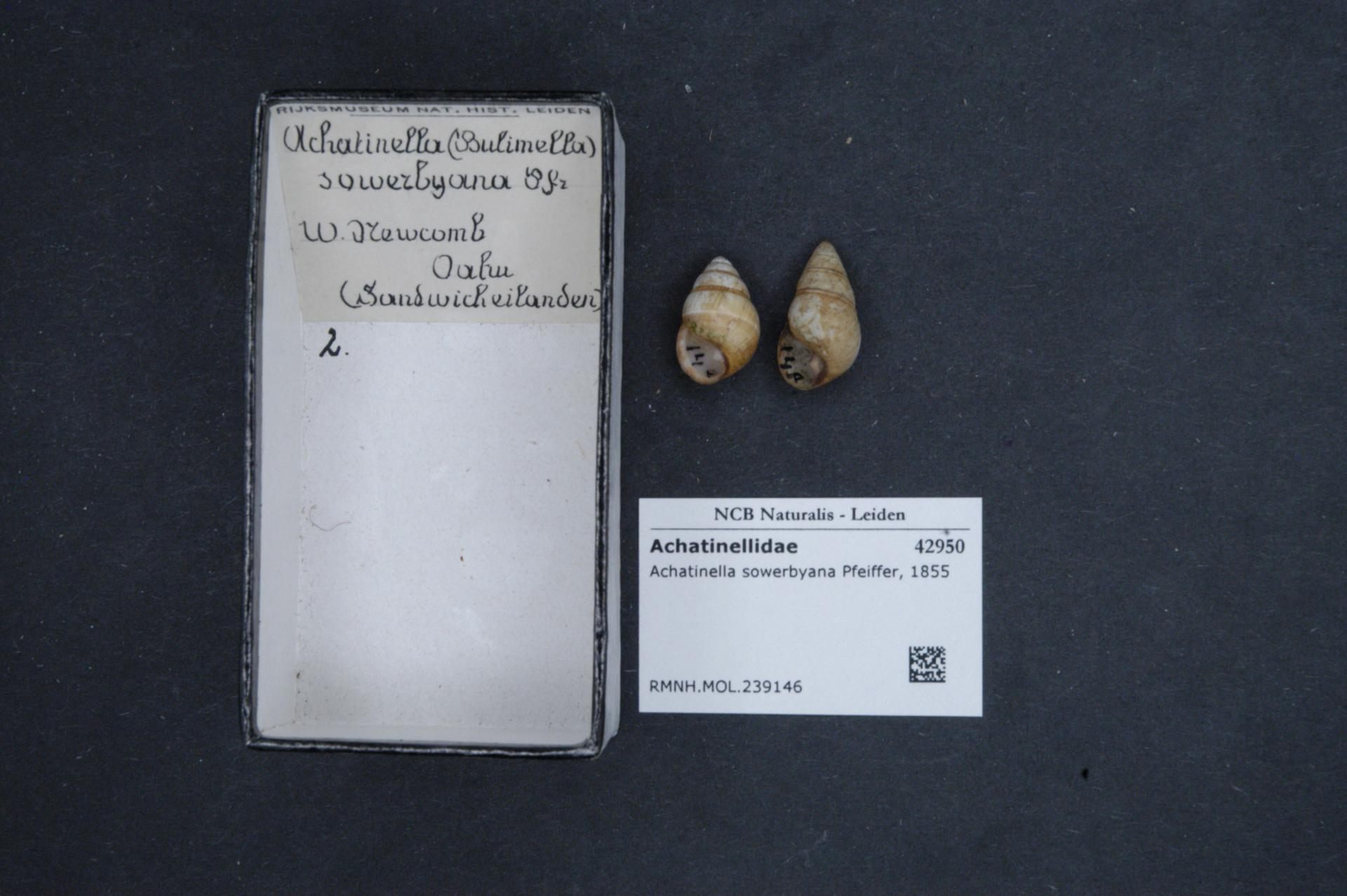
Achatinella sowerbyana
