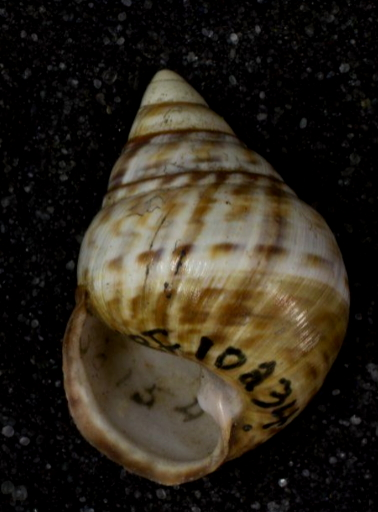
- Shell of Achatinella turgida (syntype at the Paleontological Research Institution)

Conservation status
- Critically Endangered (IUCN 2.3)

- Presumed Extinct (NatureServe)
- CITES Appendix I

Scientific classification
- Kingdom: Animalia
- Phylum: Mollusca
- Class: Gastropoda
- Order: Stylommatophora
- Family: Achatinellidae
- Genus: Achatinella
- Subgenus: Achatinella
- Species: A. turgida

Binomial name
- Achatinella turgida Newcomb, 1854

Synonyms
- Achatinella (Achatinella) albospira (E. A. Smith, 1873) junior subjective synonym; Achatinella (Achatinella) turgida Newcomb, 1854 alternative representation; Achatinella albospira (E. A Smith, 1873) junior subjective synonym; Achatinella swiftii Newcomb, 1854 junior subjective synonym; Apex albospira E. A. Smith, 1873 junior subjective synonym

= Achatinella turgida =

Species of gastropod

Achatinella turgida is a species of air-breathing land snail, a terrestrial pulmonate gastropod mollusk in the family Achatinellidae.

Subspecies

- Achatinella swiftii chromatacme Pilsbry & C. M. Cooke, 1914: synonym of Achatinella apexfulva chromatacme Pilsbry & C. M. Cooke, 1914 (basionym)
- Achatinella turgida perplexa Pilsbry & C. M. Cooke, 1914: synonym of Achatinella apexfulva perplexa Pilsbry & C. M. Cooke, 1914 (superseded combination)
- Achatinella turgida simulacrum Pilsbry & C. M. Cooke, 1914 : synonym of Achatinella apexfulva simulacrum Pilsbry & C. M. Cooke, 1914 (superseded combination)

== Description ==
(Original description) The shell is ventricose and tapers to a sharply pointed apex. It may be either sinistral or dextral in its spiral, possessing a surface that is both smooth and highly polished. As the shell develops, it enlarges gradually through the first four whorls before expanding very rapidly, such that the final two whorls constitute the majority of the entire structure.

The suture is slightly impressed, and just beneath it revolves a subtle linear depression. The aperture is subovate in shape, leading to a short columella that terminates in a strong, conical tubercle. This tubercle projects prominently into the aperture and, along with the interior of the outer lip, is often tinged with a delicate pink or brown. While the outer lip itself remains simple, it is notably thickened within.

Deep inside, the fauces (the interior portion of the aperture) are a clean white, providing a stark contrast to the exterior. The coloration of the shell is extremely various; the ground color may be white, yellow, or black, and it is frequently adorned with longitudinal zigzag lines, transverse bands, or bold blotches that sweep across the surface.

== Distribution ==
This species is endemic to Hawaii.
