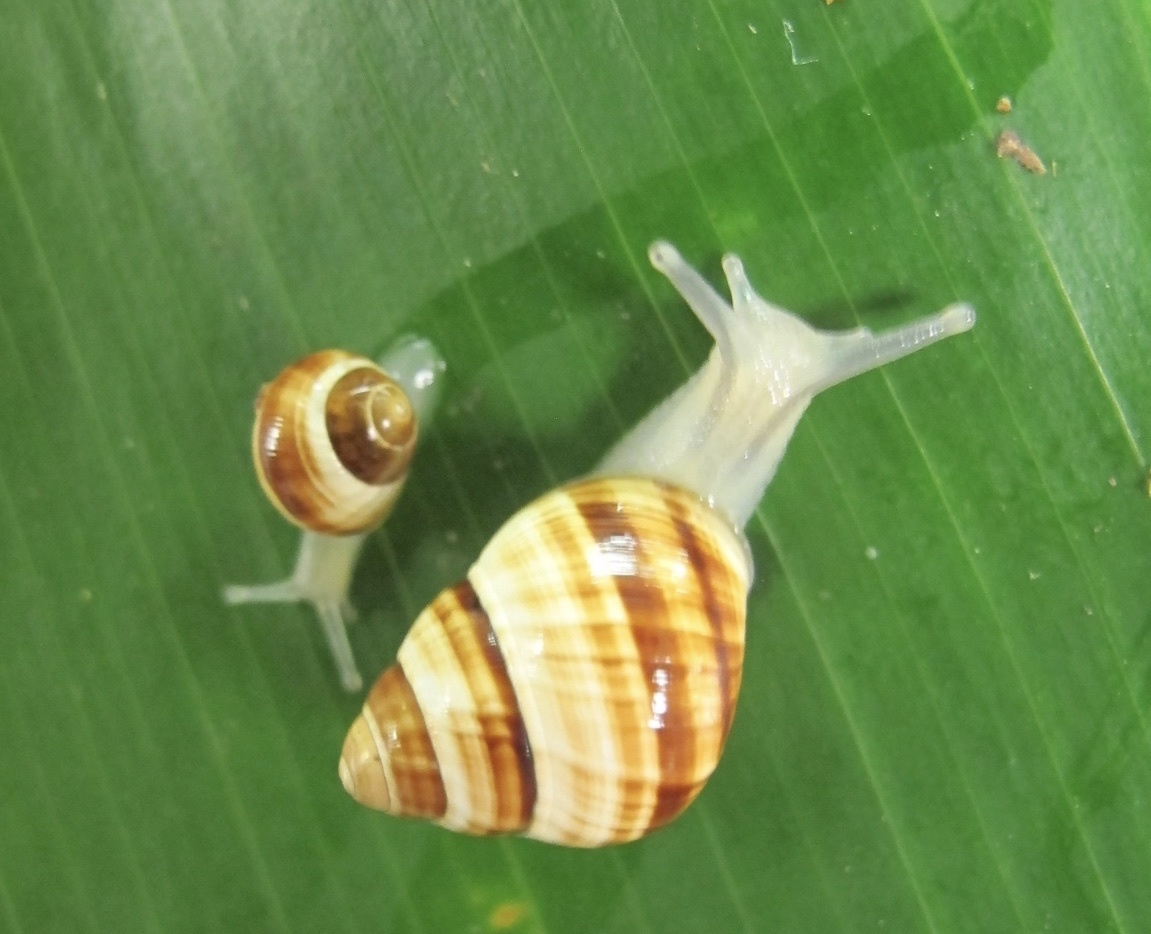

Conservation status
- Critically Endangered (IUCN 2.3)

- Critically Imperiled (NatureServe)
- CITES Appendix I

Scientific classification
- Kingdom: Animalia
- Phylum: Mollusca
- Class: Gastropoda
- Order: Stylommatophora
- Family: Achatinellidae
- Genus: Achatinella
- Subgenus: Bulimella
- Species: A. fuscobasis

Binomial name
- Achatinella fuscobasis (Smith, 1873)

Synonyms
- Achatinella luteostoma Baldwin; Achatinella lyonsiana Baldwin; Bulimella fuscobasis Smith; Bulimella rosea Hartman

= Achatinella fuscobasis =

Species of gastropod

Achatinella fuscobasis is a species of air-breathing land snail, a terrestrial pulmonate gastropod in the family Achatinellidae. This species is endemic to Hawaii.

== Shell description ==
The sinistral shell is ovate, with slightly convex whorls and the suture distinctly margined. The shell has six whorls. The color is glossy white with the last whorl yellowish and ornamented with a median zone and base of brown. The aperture is white and the brown peristome is thick. The columellar fold is strong.

The height of the shell is 16.0 mm. The width of the shell is 10.0 mm.

== Distribution ==
In the wild these snails are found in high mountains, limited to only the Hawaiian island of Oahu. Their range is limited to around 100-250 square kilometers, with the majority being found on the leeward side of the Ko'olau Mountains.

== Diet ==
Achatinella's diet consists of microscopic colonies of black mold and fungi that are consumed using the snails radula. These mold layers grow on the leaves of vegetation and the feeding of them causes no damage to the plant itself.

== Conservation status ==
In 1996 the IUCN Red List ranked the species as critically endangered. Since these snails reproduce slowly and only exist in a few limited locations, they are very vulnerable to threats. Habitat destruction for agriculture and invasive species are noted as the biggest reason for population decline, though fires, collecting, drought, hurricanes, logging and human recreation are also to blame.

=== Threats from invasive species ===
Predation from a variety of introduced species is one of the most notable reasons for the dwindling populations.

=== Species at blame ===
- Rosy wolf snail - Euglandina rosea
- Garlic snail - Oxychilus alliarus
- Flatworm - Geoplana septemlineata
- Black rat - Rattus rattus
- Brown/Norway rat - Rattus norvegicus
- Polynesian rat - Rattus exulans
