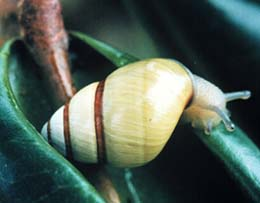

Conservation status
- Critically Endangered (IUCN 2.3)

- Critically Imperiled (NatureServe)
- CITES Appendix I

Scientific classification
- Kingdom: Animalia
- Phylum: Mollusca
- Class: Gastropoda
- Order: Stylommatophora
- Family: Achatinellidae
- Genus: Achatinella
- Subgenus: Bulimella
- Species: A. sowerbyana

Binomial name
- Achatinella sowerbyana Pfeiffer, 1855

Synonyms
- Achatinella oviformis Newcomb; Achatinella multicolor Pfeiffer; Bulimella sowerbiana Pfeiffer

= Achatinella sowerbyana =

Species of gastropod

Achatinella sowerbyana is a species of air-breathing land snail, a terrestrial pulmonate gastropod mollusk in the family Achatinellidae. This species is endemic to Hawaii.

== Shell description ==
The sinistral or dextral shell is imperforate, conic-oblong and solid. The shell has 6 whorls. The spire is slightly convexly-conic and the apex subacute. The suture is margined and the whorls are slightly convex. The glossy color is tawny buff and slightly streaked with a deeper shade. The aperture is oblique and white within. The strong columellar fold is superior, twisted, and roseate. The peristome is rose-lipped with the outer margin shortly expanded and columellar margin dilated and adnate.

The height of the shell is 18.0 mm. The width of the shell is 9.0 mm.
