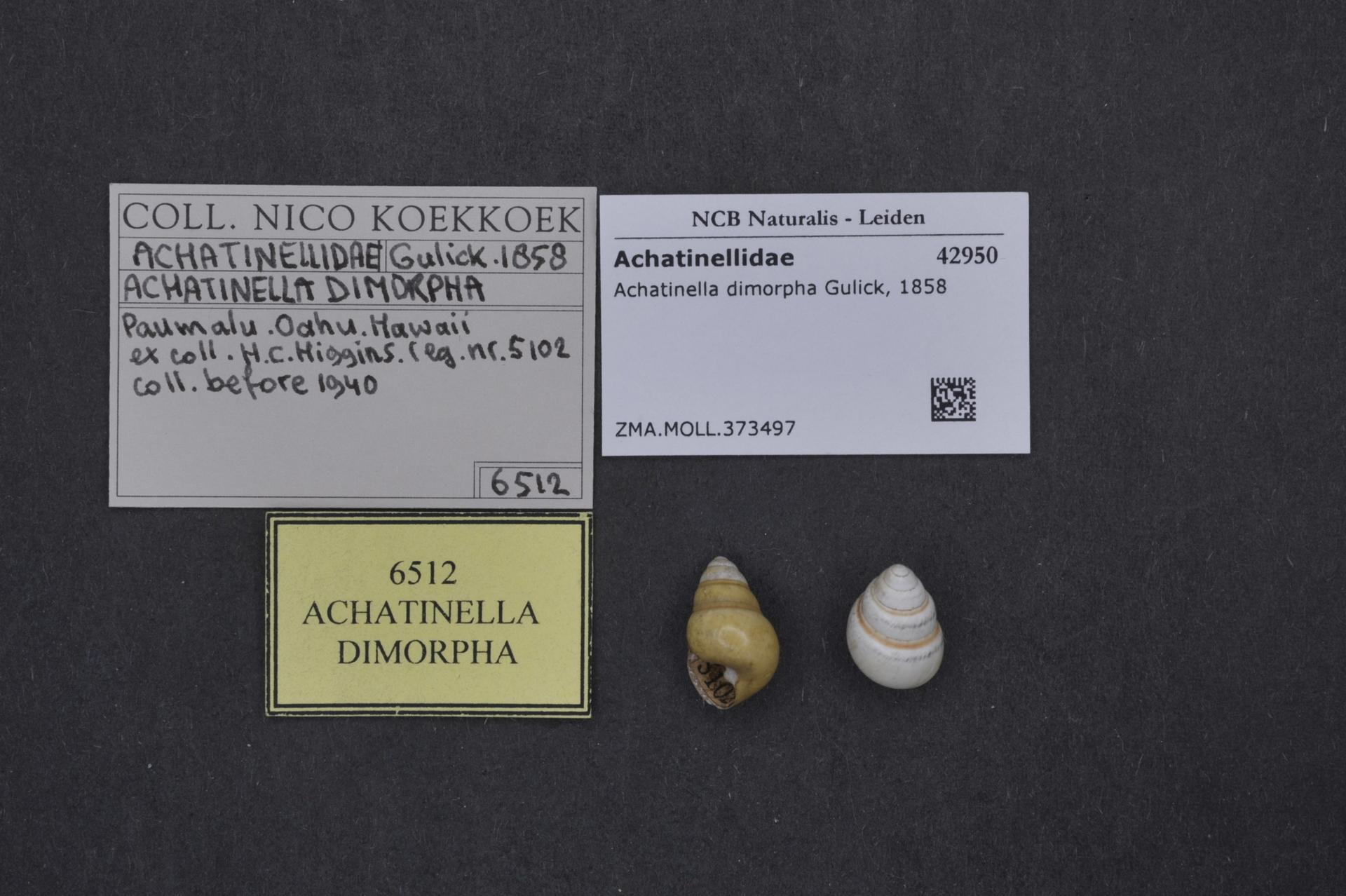
- Achatinella dimorpha shells

Conservation status
- Extinct (1967) (IUCN 2.3)

- Possibly Extinct (NatureServe)
- CITES Appendix I

Scientific classification
- Kingdom: Animalia
- Phylum: Mollusca
- Class: Gastropoda
- Order: Stylommatophora
- Family: Achatinellidae
- Genus: Achatinella
- Subgenus: Achatinellastrum
- Species: †A. dimorpha

Binomial name
- †Achatinella dimorpha Gulick, 1858
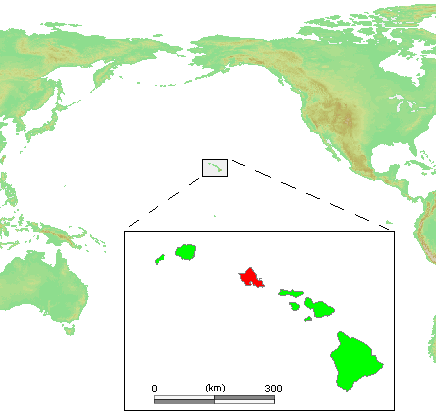
- Location of Oʻahu

= Achatinella dimorpha =

Species of gastropod

Achatinella dimorpha is a (presumed extinct) species of air-breathing land snail, a terrestrial pulmonate gastropod mollusk in the family Achatinellidae. This species was present in Oʻahu, but has not been seen since 1967, or perhaps earlier.
