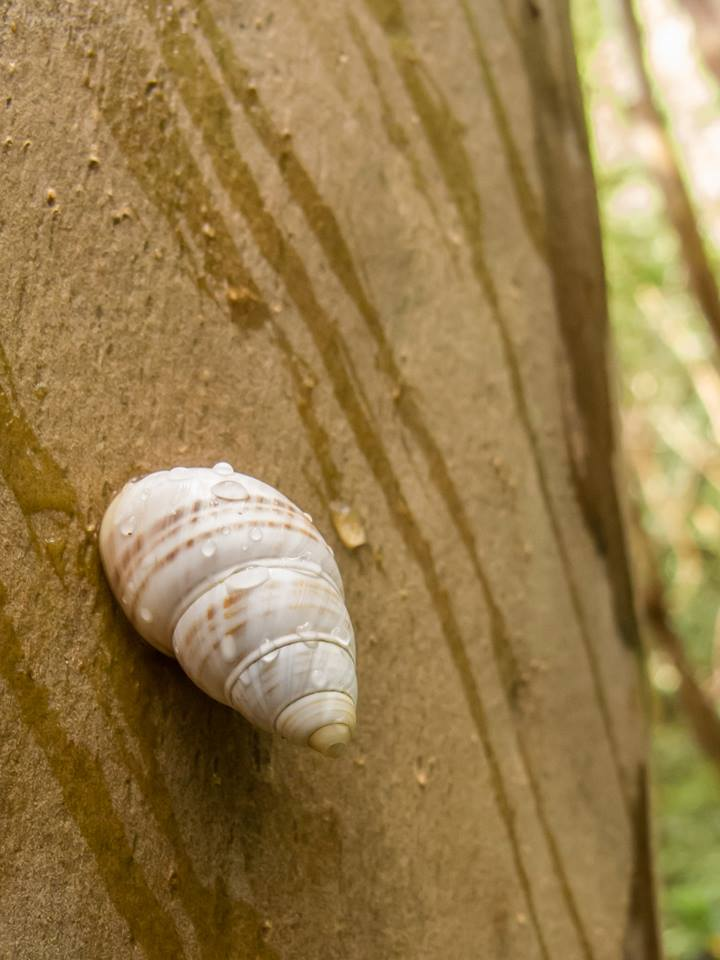

Conservation status
- Critically Endangered (IUCN 2.3)

- Critically Imperiled (NatureServe)
- CITES Appendix I

Scientific classification
- Kingdom: Animalia
- Phylum: Mollusca
- Class: Gastropoda
- Order: Stylommatophora
- Family: Achatinellidae
- Genus: Achatinella
- Subgenus: Achatinellastrum
- Species: A. fulgens

Binomial name
- Achatinella fulgens Newcomb, 1853

= Achatinella fulgens =

Species of snail

Achatinella fulgens is a species of air-breathing land snail, a terrestrial pulmonate gastropod mollusc within the Achatinella genus of the family Achatinellidae. The species is one of a collection of snail species commonly referred to as Oʻahu tree snails or pupu kuahiwi in the Hawaiian language.

== Description ==
The snail is described as having a long and glossy cone-shaped shell that is ivory-colored. The ivory-colored shell is also described as featuring belts of various colors, including "cloudy-gray, mahogany or ebony".

== Distribution and habitat ==
This specific species of Achatinella is endemic to the southern Koʻolau Range of Oahu. However, there are only few known instances of the species, some of which exist in captivity. As of 2014, the total number of captive Achatinella fulgens was 2. The species is arboreal in the wild, as its natural habitat lies within Oahu's guava forests at lower elevations.

In 2016, a landslide destroyed the last known habitat of this species. Only 6 snails were found and evacuated. As of 2022, the species is extinct in the wild, but there are over 50 snails in captivity. As of 2024, there are 91 individuals in the captive breeding program.

== Human use and cultural significance ==
Achatinella fulgens is used by humans mainly for scientific purposes, as specimens of the species have been collected throughout the years for study. Achatinella species are of major significance within Hawaiian culture, as chronicled within Hawaiian oral tradition. Historically, these land snails have been said by the Hawaiians to possess the ability to sing.
