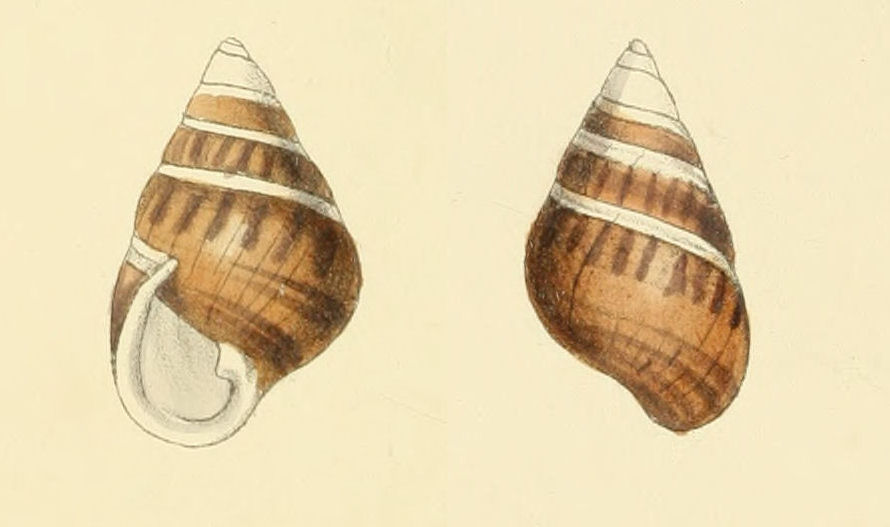
- Drawing of a shell of Achatinella decora.

Conservation status
- Extinct (IUCN 2.3)

- Presumed Extinct (NatureServe)
- CITES Appendix I

Scientific classification
- Kingdom: Animalia
- Phylum: Mollusca
- Class: Gastropoda
- Order: Stylommatophora
- Family: Achatinellidae
- Genus: Achatinella
- Subgenus: Achatinella
- Species: †A. decora

Binomial name
- †Achatinella decora (Férussac, 1821)
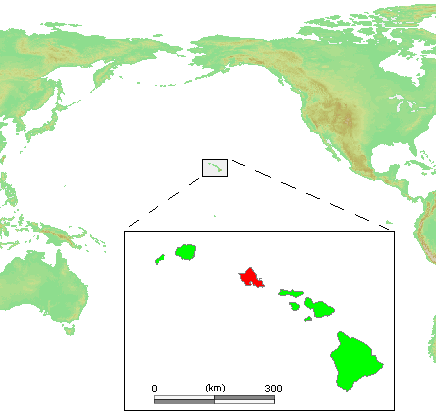
- Location of Oʻahu

= Achatinella decora =

Extinct species of gastropod

Achatinella decora is an extinct species of air-breathing land snail, a terrestrial pulmonate gastropod mollusk in the family Achatinellidae. This species was endemic to Oʻahu, Hawaiʻi.

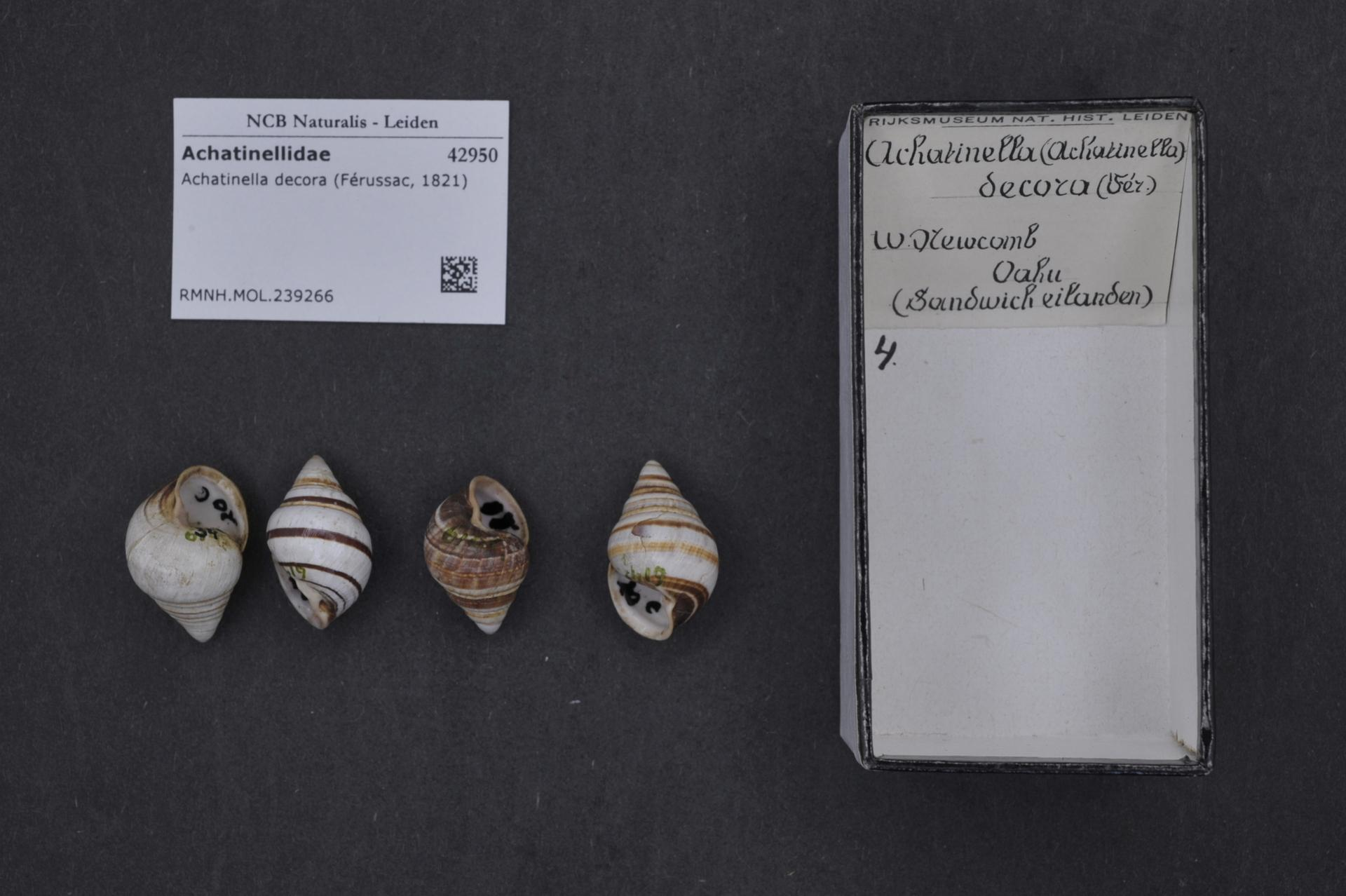
Achatinella decora shells.
