= Achatinella spaldingi =

Conservation status
- Extinct (IUCN 2.3)

- Presumed Extinct (NatureServe)
- CITES Appendix I

Scientific classification
- Kingdom: Animalia
- Phylum: Mollusca
- Class: Gastropoda
- Order: Stylommatophora
- Family: Achatinellidae
- Genus: Achatinella
- Subgenus: Achatinellastrum
- Species: †A. spaldingi

Binomial name
- †Achatinella spaldingi Pilsbry & Cooke, 1914
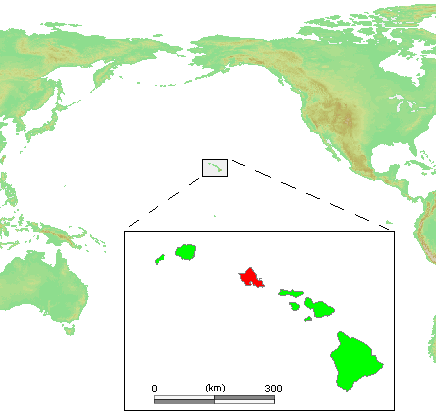
- Location of Oʻahu

Extinct species of gastropod

Achatinella spaldingi is an extinct species of air-breathing land snail, a terrestrial pulmonate gastropod mollusk in the family Achatinellidae, now extinct. This species was endemic to Oʻahu, Hawaiʻi.
