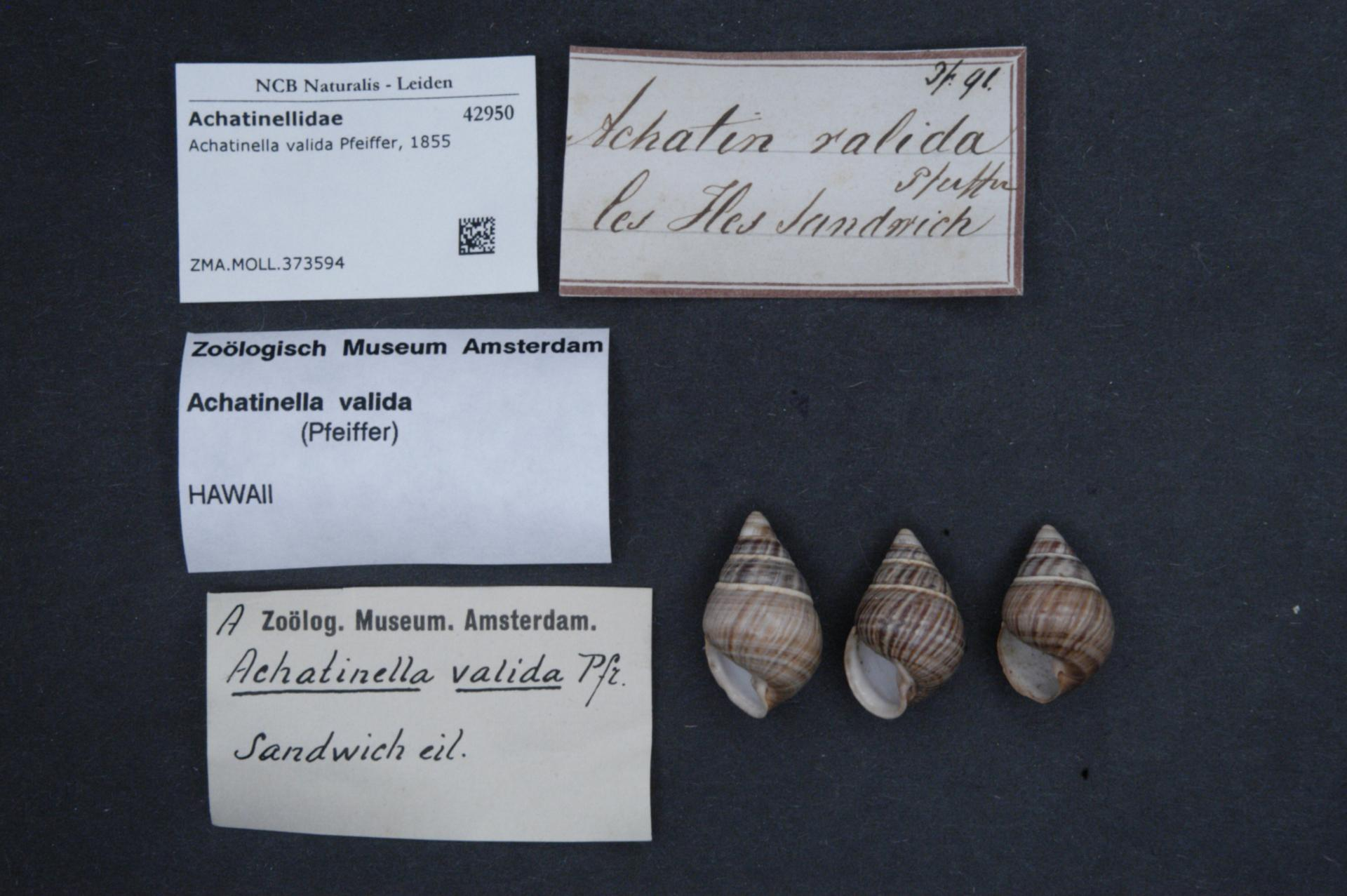
- Achatinella valida shells

Conservation status
- Extinct (IUCN 2.3)

- Presumed Extinct (NatureServe)
- CITES Appendix I

Scientific classification
- Kingdom: Animalia
- Phylum: Mollusca
- Class: Gastropoda
- Order: Stylommatophora
- Family: Achatinellidae
- Genus: Achatinella
- Subgenus: Achatinella
- Species: †A. valida

Binomial name
- †Achatinella valida Pfeiffer, 1855
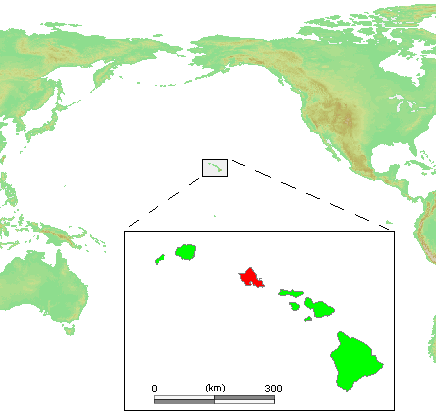
- Location of Oʻahu

= Achatinella valida =

Extinct species of gastropod

Achatinella valida is an extinct species of air-breathing land snail, a terrestrial pulmonate gastropod mollusk in the family Achatinellidae. This species was endemic to Oʻahu, Hawaiʻi.
