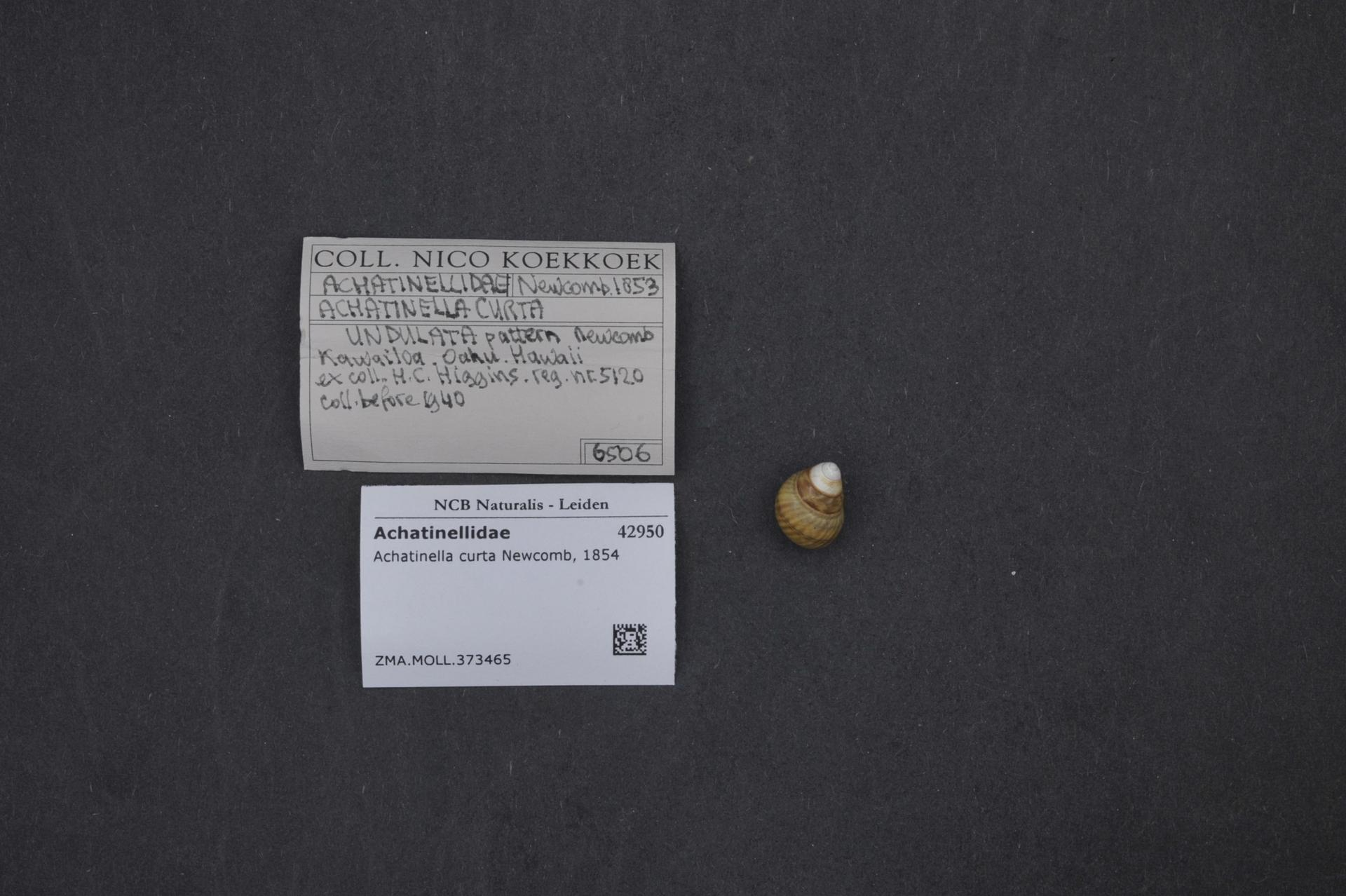

Conservation status
- Critically Endangered (IUCN 2.3)

- Critically Imperiled (NatureServe)
- CITES Appendix I

Scientific classification
- Kingdom: Animalia
- Phylum: Mollusca
- Class: Gastropoda
- Order: Stylommatophora
- Family: Achatinellidae
- Genus: Achatinella
- Subgenus: Achatinellastrum
- Species: A. curta

Binomial name
- Achatinella curta Newcomb, 1853

= Achatinella curta =

Species of gastropod

Achatinella curta is a species of air-breathing land snail, a terrestrial pulmonate gastropod mollusk in the family Achatinellidae. This species is endemic to the Hawaiian Islands.

== Description ==
Adults of Achatinella curta can get 21.4 mm long and 10.3 mm wide. The shell of adults has five whorls and can be either dextral or sinistral. Their shell has a color scheme of polished yellow or chestnut with a plain or black sutural band, rarely with two or more on the last whorl.

== Distribution and habitat ==
Achatinella curta is endemic in the island of Oahu of the Hawaiian Islands. Achatinella curta are found on trees.

== Conservation status ==
Achatinella curta is classified as critically endangered. The species was last observed in 1990 on the Kawailoa and Peahinaia Trail on Oahu, Hawaii.
