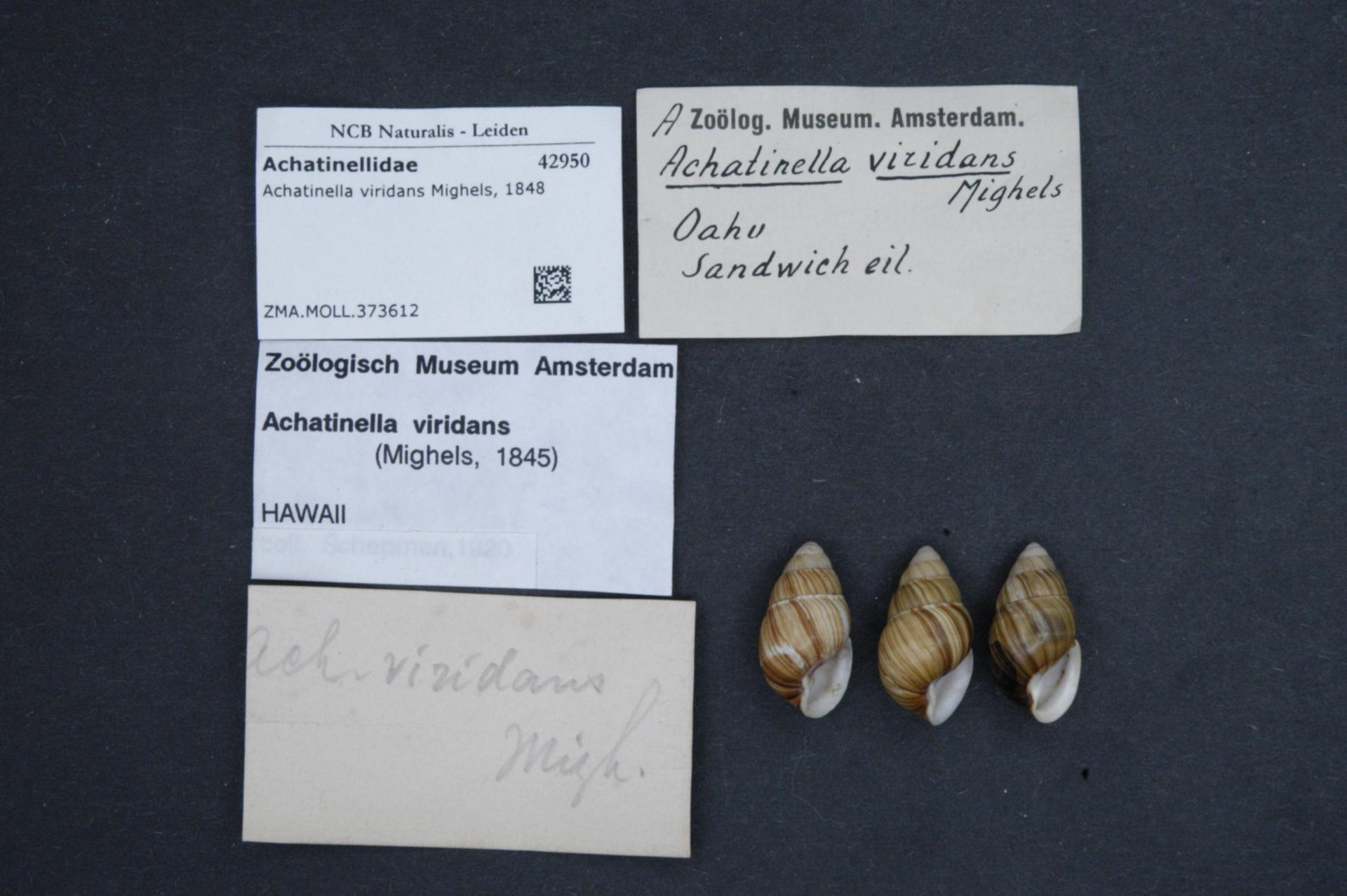

Conservation status
- Critically Endangered (IUCN 2.3)

- Possibly Extinct (NatureServe)
- CITES Appendix I

Scientific classification
- Kingdom: Animalia
- Phylum: Mollusca
- Class: Gastropoda
- Order: Stylommatophora
- Family: Achatinellidae
- Genus: Achatinella
- Subgenus: Bulimella
- Species: A. viridans

Binomial name
- Achatinella viridans Mighels, 1845

Synonyms
- Achatinella radiata Pfeiffer; Achatinella subvirens Newcomb; Achatinella rutila Newcomb; Achatinella macrostoma Pfeiffer

= Achatinella viridans =

Species of gastropod

Achatinella viridans is a species of air-breathing land snail, a terrestrial pulmonate gastropod mollusc in the family Achatinellidae. This species is endemic to Hawaii.

== Shell description ==
The dextral shell is elongate-conic, imperforate with convex whorls and a slightly impressed line below the suture. The shell has five whorls. The color is green with light streaks intermixed. The aperture is subovate and stained with a pink color just within the margin. The lip is slightly thickened.

The height of the shell is 19.2 mm. The width of the shell is 12.0 mm.
