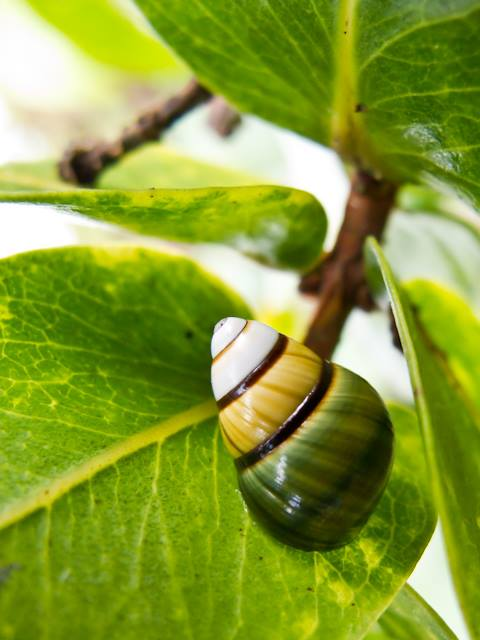

Conservation status
- Critically Endangered (IUCN 2.3)

- Critically Imperiled (NatureServe)
- CITES Appendix I

Scientific classification
- Kingdom: Animalia
- Phylum: Mollusca
- Class: Gastropoda
- Order: Stylommatophora
- Family: Achatinellidae
- Genus: Achatinella
- Subgenus: Bulimella
- Species: A. byronii

Binomial name
- Achatinella byronii (Wood, 1828)

Synonyms
- Achatinella melanostoma Newcomb; Achatinella limbata Gulick; Achatinella ruguosa Newcomb; Bulimella rugosa Lyons; Helix byronii Wood; Helicteres byronensis (Gray)

= Achatinella byronii =

Species of gastropod in Hawaii

Achatinella byronii is a species of air-breathing land snail, a terrestrial pulmonate gastropod mollusk in the family Achatinellidae. This species is endemic to Oahu, in the Hawaiian Islands.

Achatinella byronii is the type species of the subgenus Bulimella.

== Shell description ==
The dextral or sinistral shell is imperforate and pyramidal-conic; solid and glossy with an obtuse apex. The shell has 6.5 whorls. Shell color varies, but is typically green and light greenish-yellow in oblique streaks on the last two whorls, with a faint green peripheral band and a dark chestnut band bordering the suture below.

The preceding whorl is yellow with a chestnut band and the three embryonic whorls are pinkish gray. The aperture is white and the lip is bordered with dark brown. Faint spiral striae sculpture the embryonic whorls, and later whorls are convex and irregularly wrinkled in the direction of growth-lines. The whorls are convex and the last is often very obtusely angular at the periphery. The aperture is strongly oblique and the lip thickened within by a strong rib near the margin. The columellar fold is moderate, and white or tinted.

The height of the shell is 20.0 mm. The width of the shell is 11.0 mm.
