= Hungerfordia (gastropod) =

Scientific classification
- Kingdom: Animalia
- Phylum: Mollusca
- Class: Gastropoda
- Subclass: Caenogastropoda
- Order: Architaenioglossa
- Family: Diplommatinidae
- Genus: Hungerfordia; Beddome, 1889

Genus of gastropods

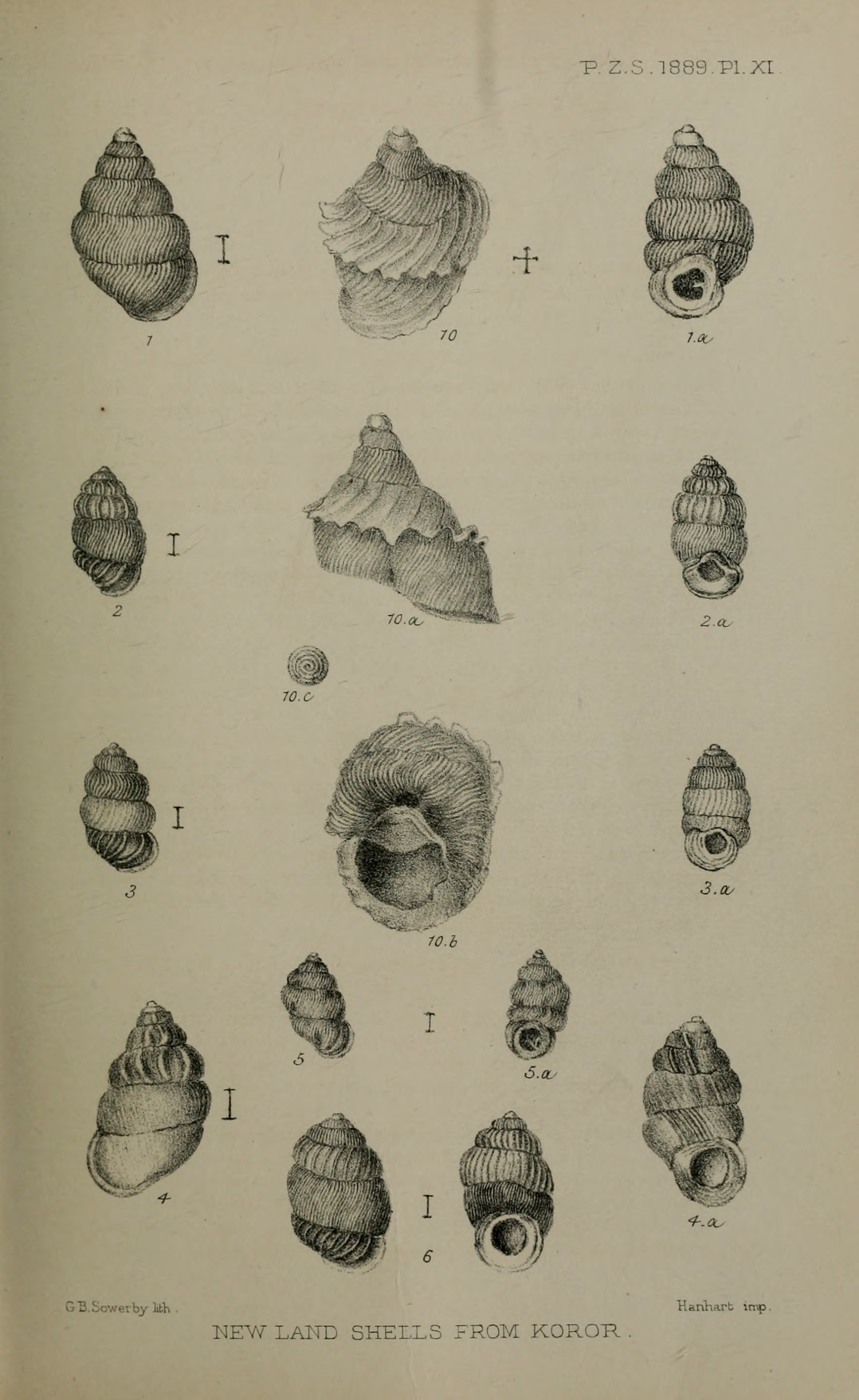
Diplommatinidae land snails from Koror Island, Palau.

Hungerfordia is a genus of small land snails with an operculum, a terrestrial gastropod mollusk in the family Diplommatinidae endemic to the Republic of Palau. Many of the members of this genus inhabit limestone cliffs or rubble, especially in the Rock Islands (Chelbacheb) in Airai, Koror, and Peleliu states. As of 2022, there are 41 described species in this genus. A series of revisions in 2013 - 2015 described several new species, as well as transferring Palauan members of the genus Diplommatina or Palaina (including Palau endemics Diplommatina alata, D. aurea, D. crassilabris, D. gibboni, D. inflatula, D. lamellata, D. lutea, D. pyramis, and D. ringens) into Hungerfordia.

== Species ==
Species within the genus Hungerfordia include:

- Hungerfordia alata
- Hungerfordia angaurensis
- Hungerfordia aspera
- Hungerfordia aurea
- Hungerfordia basodonta
- Hungerfordia brachyptera
- Hungerfordia chilorhytis
- Hungerfordia crassilabris
- Hungerfordia crenata
- Hungerfordia echinata
- Hungerfordia elegantissima
- Hungerfordia eurystoma
- Hungerfordia expansilabris
- Hungerfordia fragilipennis
- Hungerfordia gibboni
- Hungerfordia globosa
- Hungerfordia goniobasis
- Hungerfordia inflatula
- Hungerfordia irregularis
- Hungerfordia lamellata
- Hungerfordia longissima
- Hungerfordia loxodonta
- Hungerfordia lutea
- Hungerfordia microbasodonta
- Hungerfordia ngereamensis
- Hungerfordia nodulosa
- Hungerfordia nudicollum
- Hungerfordia omphaloptyx
- Hungerfordia papilio
- Hungerfordia pelewensis
- Hungerfordia polymorpha
- Hungerfordia pteropurpuroides
- Hungerfordia pyramis
- Hungerfordia ringens
- Hungerfordia robiginosa
- Hungerfordia rudicostata
- Hungerfordia spinoscapula
- Hungerfordia spiroperculata
- Hungerfordia subalata
- Hungerfordia triplochilus
- Hungerfordia unisulcata

== Subspecies ==
There are currently 19 named subspecies of Hungerfordia distributed among 8 different species:

- Hungerfordia crassilabris attenuata
- Hungerfordia crassilabris crassilabris
- Hungerfordia crassilabris tridentata
- Hungerfordia echinata echinata
- Hungerfordia echinata tubulispina
- Hungerfordia elegantissima anomphala
- Hungerfordia elegantissima elegantissima
- Hungerfordia goniobasis dmasechensis
- Hungerfordia goniobasis exserta
- Hungerfordia goniobasis goniobasis
- Hungerfordia lutea hemilaevis
- Hungerfordia lutea lutea
- Hungerfordia papilio papilio
- Hungerfordia papilio stenoptera
- Hungerfordia pyramis pteroma
- Hungerfordia pyramis pyramis
- Hungerfordia ringens ringens
- Hungerfordia ringens rotundata
- Hungerfordia ringens ventrinodus
