= Moussonia =

Moussonia may refer to:

- Moussonia (gastropod), a genus of gastropods in the family Diplommatinidae
- Moussonia (plant), a genus of plants in the family Gesneriaceae
- Moussonia, a genus of gastropods in the family Oxychilidae, synonym of Daudebardia
