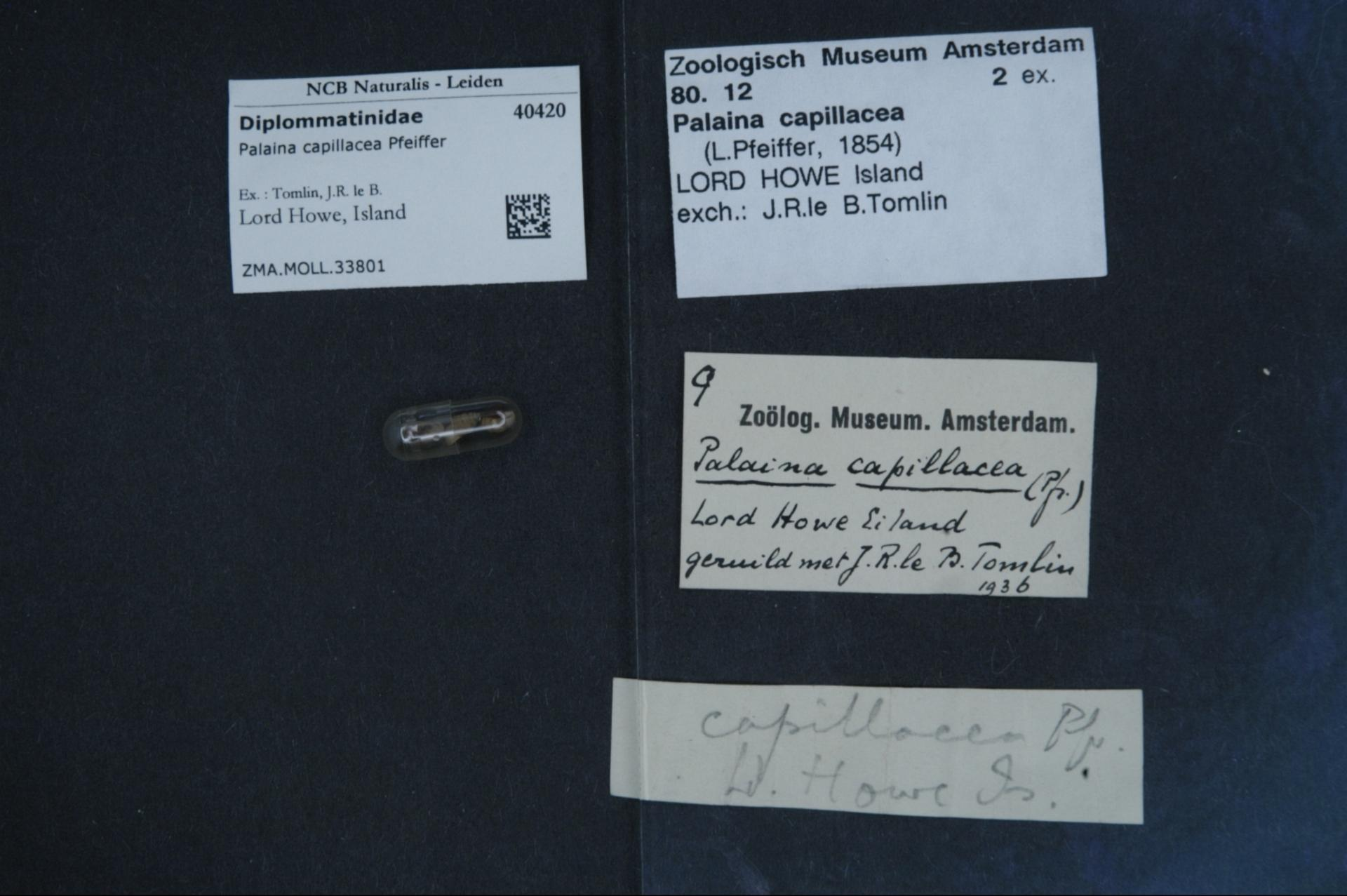
- Specimen of Palaina capillacea at Naturalis Biodiversity Center

Scientific classification
- Domain: Eukaryota
- Kingdom: Animalia
- Phylum: Mollusca
- Class: Gastropoda
- Subclass: Caenogastropoda
- Order: Architaenioglossa
- Superfamily: Cyclophoroidea
- Family: Diplommatinidae
- Genus: Palaina
- Species: P. capillacea

Binomial name
- Palaina capillacea (Pfeiffer, 1855)
- Location of Lord Howe Island

Synonyms
- Diplommatina capillacea Pfeiff., 1855; Palaina capillacea definita Iredale, 1944; Palaina howeinsulae Iredale, 1944; Palaina nicholsae Iredale, 1944

= Palaina capillacea =

Species of land snail

Palaina capillacea, also known as the strong-bladed staircase snail, is a species of staircase snail that is endemic to Australia's Lord Howe Island in the Tasman Sea.

== Description ==
The pupiform shell of adult snails is 3.8–4.1 mm in height, with a diameter of 1.9–2.1 mm and a conical spire. It is white in colour, with impressed sutures. It has bold, closely spaced, axal ribs. The umbilicus is closed. The circular aperture has a flared lip and an operculum is present. The animal has a white body with dark grey cephalic tentacles and black eyes.

== Habitat ==
The snail is common and widespread throughout the island.
