= Palaina lucia =

Scientific classification
- Domain: Eukaryota
- Kingdom: Animalia
- Phylum: Mollusca
- Class: Gastropoda
- Subclass: Caenogastropoda
- Order: Architaenioglossa
- Superfamily: Cyclophoroidea
- Family: Diplommatinidae
- Genus: Palaina
- Species: P. lucia

Binomial name
- Palaina lucia Iredale, 1944
- Location of Lord Howe Island

Species of land snail

Palaina lucia, also known as Lucy's staircase snail, is a species of staircase snail that is endemic to Australia's Lord Howe Island in the Tasman Sea.

== Description ==
The globose pupiform shell of adult snails is 3.2–3.5 mm in height, with a diameter of 1.9–2 mm. It is reddfish-brown in colour, with a white peripheral band on the final whorl, white radial streak above the aperture, and deeply impressed sutures. It has strong, widely spaced, axal ribs. The umbilicus is closed. The circular aperture has a strongly reflected lip and an operculum is present.

== Habitat ==
The snail is found on the upper slopes and summits of the southern mountains.
