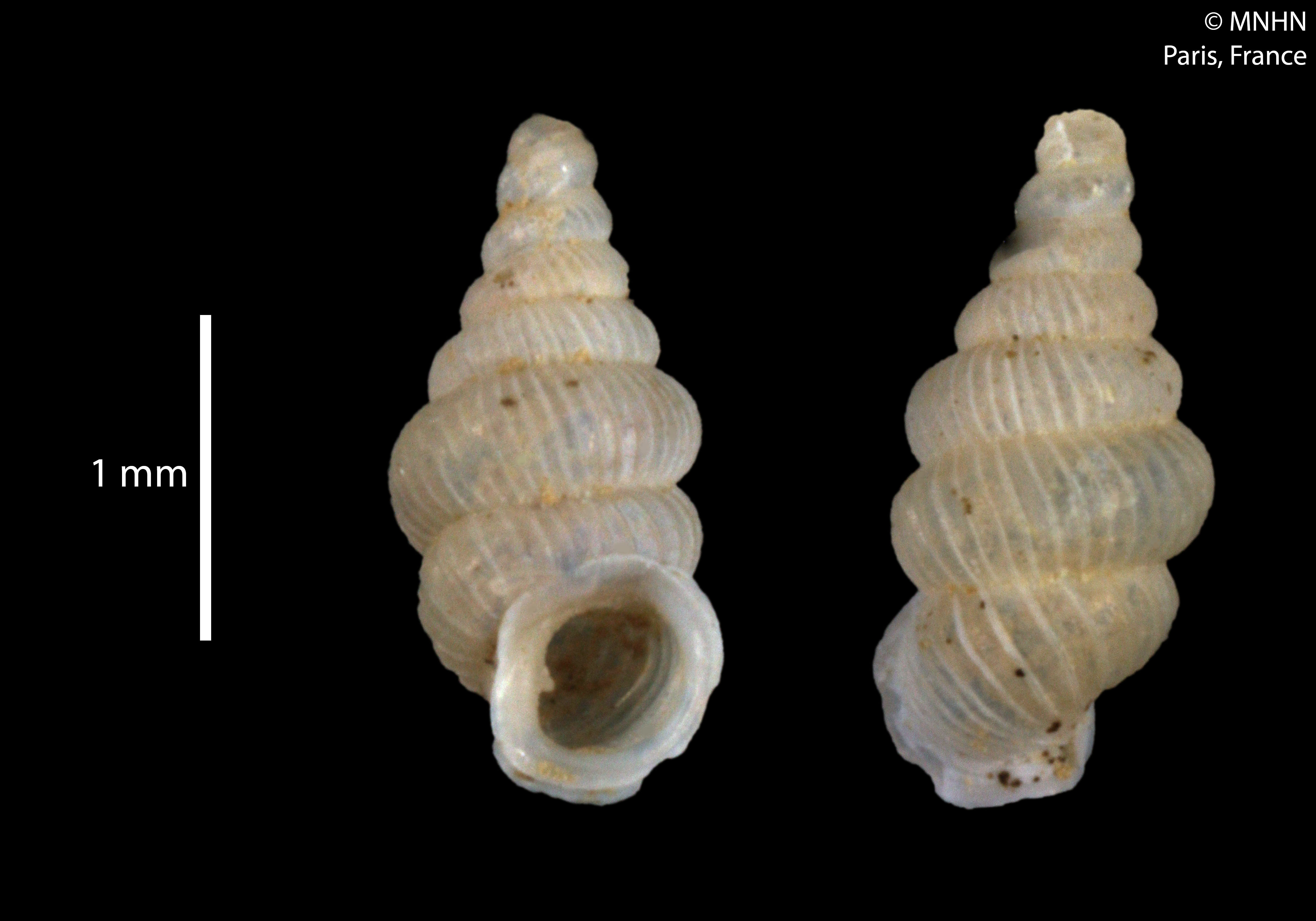
- Shell of Diplommatina cacuminulus (paratype at MNHN, Paris)

Conservation status
- Critically Endangered (IUCN 3.1)

Scientific classification
- Kingdom: Animalia
- Phylum: Mollusca
- Class: Gastropoda
- Subclass: Caenogastropoda
- Order: Architaenioglossa
- Superfamily: Cyclophoroidea
- Family: Diplommatinidae
- Genus: Diplommatina
- Species: D. cacuminulus

Binomial name
- Diplommatina cacuminulus Vermeulen, 1993

= Diplommatina cacuminulus =

Species of gastropod

Diplommatina cacuminulus is a species of land snail with an operculum, terrestrial gastropod mollusc in the family Diplommatinidae.

== Distribution ==
This species is endemic to Malaysia. Its natural habitat is subtropical or tropical moist lowland forests. It is threatened by habitat loss.
