= Palaina platycheilus =

Conservation status
- Critically Endangered (IUCN 3.1)

Scientific classification
- Kingdom: Animalia
- Phylum: Mollusca
- Class: Gastropoda
- Subclass: Caenogastropoda
- Order: Architaenioglossa
- Family: Diplommatinidae
- Genus: Palaina
- Species: P. platycheilus

Binomial name
- Palaina platycheilus (Beddome, 1889)

Species of gastropod

Palaina platycheilus is a species of small land snail with an operculum, a terrestrial gastropod mollusk or micromollusks in the family Diplommatinidae. This species is endemic to Palau.
