= Arinia oviformis =

Conservation status
- Critically Endangered (IUCN 3.1)

Scientific classification
- Kingdom: Animalia
- Phylum: Mollusca
- Class: Gastropoda
- Subclass: Caenogastropoda
- Order: Architaenioglossa
- Superfamily: Cyclophoroidea
- Family: Diplommatinidae
- Genus: Arinia
- Species: A. oviformis

Binomial name
- Arinia oviformis Vermeulen, 1996

Species of gastropod

Arinia oviformis is a species of small land snails with an operculum, terrestrial gastropod molluscs in the family Diplommatinidae. This species is endemic to Malaysia. Its natural habitat is subtropical or tropical moist lowland forests. It is threatened by habitat loss.
