= Diplommatina aurea =

Conservation status
- Critically Endangered (IUCN 3.1)

Scientific classification
- Kingdom: Animalia
- Phylum: Mollusca
- Class: Gastropoda
- Subclass: Caenogastropoda
- Order: Architaenioglossa
- Superfamily: Cyclophoroidea
- Family: Diplommatinidae
- Genus: Diplommatina
- Species: D. aurea

Binomial name
- Diplommatina aurea E. H. Beddome, 1889

Species of gastropod

Diplommatina aurea is a species of land snail with an operculum, terrestrial gastropod mollusc in the family Diplommatinidae. This species is endemic to Palau.
