= Arinia streptaxiformis =

Conservation status
- Endangered (IUCN 3.1)

Scientific classification
- Kingdom: Animalia
- Phylum: Mollusca
- Class: Gastropoda
- Subclass: Caenogastropoda
- Order: Architaenioglossa
- Superfamily: Cyclophoroidea
- Family: Diplommatinidae
- Genus: Arinia
- Species: A. streptaxiformis

Binomial name
- Arinia streptaxiformis Vermeulen, 1996

Species of gastropod

Arinia streptaxiformis is a species of small land snails with an operculum, terrestrial gastropod molluscs in the family Diplommatinidae. This species is endemic to Malaysia. Its natural habitat is subtropical or tropical moist lowland forests. It is threatened by habitat loss.
