= Diplommatina akirai =

Scientific classification
- Kingdom: Animalia
- Phylum: Mollusca
- Class: Gastropoda
- Subclass: Caenogastropoda
- Order: Architaenioglossa
- Family: Diplommatinidae
- Genus: Diplommatina
- Species: D. akirai

Binomial name
- Diplommatina akirai Chang & Ookubo, 1998

Species of land snail

Diplommatina akirai is a species of land snail with an operculum, terrestrial gastropod mollusks in the family Diplommatinidae.

This species is endemic to Taiwan, where it is found in high-altitude mountainous areas in Xiulin Township, Hualien County. It inhabits leaf litter in forested environments. The shell is tiny, resembling a sesame seed in size, measuring approximately 3.5 mm, with a reddish hue.
