= Arinia biplicata =

Conservation status
- Endangered (IUCN 3.1)

Scientific classification
- Kingdom: Animalia
- Phylum: Mollusca
- Class: Gastropoda
- Subclass: Caenogastropoda
- Order: Architaenioglossa
- Superfamily: Cyclophoroidea
- Family: Diplommatinidae
- Genus: Arinia
- Species: A. biplicata

Binomial name
- Arinia biplicata Vermeulen, 1996

Species of gastropod

Arinia biplicata is a species of small land snails with an operculum, terrestrial gastropod molluscs in the family Diplommatinidae. This species is endemic to Malaysia. Its natural habitat is subtropical or tropical moist lowland forests. It is threatened by habitat loss.
