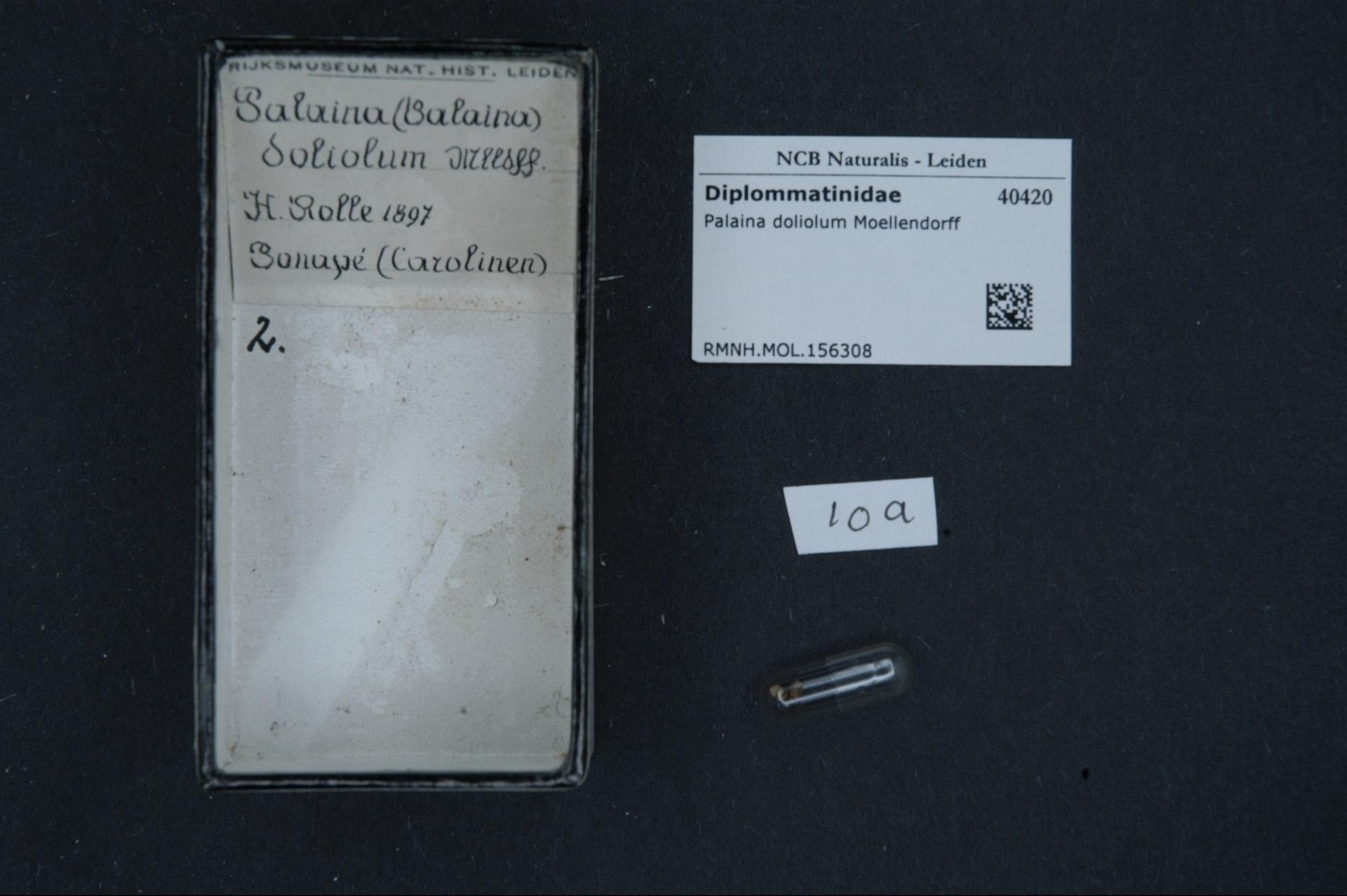
- Palaina doliolum Von Moellendorff, 1897

Conservation status
- Data Deficient (IUCN 2.3)

Scientific classification
- Kingdom: Animalia
- Phylum: Mollusca
- Class: Gastropoda
- Subclass: Caenogastropoda
- Order: Architaenioglossa
- Family: Diplommatinidae
- Genus: Palaina
- Species: P. doliolum

Binomial name
- Palaina doliolum (von Möllendorf, 1897)

= Palaina doliolum =

Species of gastropod

Palaina doliolum is a species of minute land snail with an operculum, a terrestrial gastropod mollusk or micromollusks in the family Diplommatinidae. This species is endemic to Micronesia.
