= Palaina waterhousei =

Scientific classification
- Domain: Eukaryota
- Kingdom: Animalia
- Phylum: Mollusca
- Class: Gastropoda
- Subclass: Caenogastropoda
- Order: Architaenioglossa
- Superfamily: Cyclophoroidea
- Family: Diplommatinidae
- Genus: Palaina
- Species: P. waterhousei

Binomial name
- Palaina waterhousei Iredale, 1944
- Location of Lord Howe Island

Species of land snail

Palaina waterhousei, also known as the wide-ribbed staircase snail, is a species of staircase snail that is endemic to Australia's Lord Howe Island in the Tasman Sea.

== Description ==
The pupiform shell of adult snails is 2.8–3.1 mm in height, with a diameter of 1.7 mm, with a domed spire. It is white in colour, with golden-brown apical whorls. It has widely spaced, axal ribs. The umbilicus is closed. The circular aperture has a strongly reflected lip and an operculum is present.

== Habitat ==
The snail is common and widespread across the island.
