= Diplommatina lutea =

Conservation status
- Near Threatened (IUCN 3.1)

Scientific classification
- Kingdom: Animalia
- Phylum: Mollusca
- Class: Gastropoda
- Subclass: Caenogastropoda
- Order: Architaenioglossa
- Superfamily: Cyclophoroidea
- Family: Diplommatinidae
- Genus: Diplommatina
- Species: D. lutea

Binomial name
- Diplommatina lutea E. H. Beddome, 1889

Species of gastropod

Diplommatina lutea is a species of land snail with an operculum, terrestrial gastropod mollusc in the family Diplommatinidae.

This species is endemic to Palau.
