= Palaina intercollis =

Scientific classification
- Domain: Eukaryota
- Kingdom: Animalia
- Phylum: Mollusca
- Class: Gastropoda
- Subclass: Caenogastropoda
- Order: Architaenioglossa
- Superfamily: Cyclophoroidea
- Family: Diplommatinidae
- Genus: Palaina
- Species: P. intercollis

Binomial name
- Palaina intercollis Shea & Griffiths, 2010
- Location of Lord Howe Island

Species of land snail

Palaina intercollis, also known as the Intermediate Hill staircase snail, is a species of staircase snail that is endemic to Australia's Lord Howe Island in the Tasman Sea.

== Description ==
The globose pupiform shell of adult snails is 4.7–5 mm in height, with a diameter of 2.6–2.8 mm. It is light to dark golden-brown in colour, sometimes with a white peripheral band, and with paler ribs. The circular aperture has a strongly reflected lip. The animal has a white body with dark grey cephalic tentacles and black eyes.

== Habitat ==
The snail is most common in the Intermediate Hill area and on the lower slopes of Mount Lidgbird.
