= Palaina thomasrinteleni =

Scientific classification
- Kingdom: Animalia
- Phylum: Mollusca
- Class: Gastropoda
- Subclass: Caenogastropoda
- Order: Architaenioglossa
- Family: Diplommatinidae
- Genus: Palaina
- Species: P. thomasrinteleni

Binomial name
- Palaina thomasrinteleni Greķe, 2017

Species of gastropod

Palaina thomasrinteleni is a species of snail in the family Diplommatinidae. The scientific name of the species was first validly published in 2017 by Greķe.
