= Palaina edwardi =

Scientific classification
- Domain: Eukaryota
- Kingdom: Animalia
- Phylum: Mollusca
- Class: Gastropoda
- Subclass: Caenogastropoda
- Order: Architaenioglossa
- Superfamily: Cyclophoroidea
- Family: Diplommatinidae
- Genus: Palaina
- Species: P. edwardi

Binomial name
- Palaina edwardi Iredale, 1944
- Location of Lord Howe Island

Species of land snail

Palaina edwardi, also known as Edward's staircase snail, is a species of staircase snail that is endemic to Australia's Lord Howe Island in the Tasman Sea.

== Description ==
The globose pupiform shell of adult snails is 3–3.1 mm in height, with a diameter of 1.7 mm, with deeply impressed sutures. It is pale golden-brown in colour, with a white peripheral band on the final whorl and radial streak above the aperture. It has widely spaced axal ribs. The umbilicus is closed. The circular aperture has a strongly reflected lip and an operculum.

== Habitat ==
The snail is rare and only found on the southern mountains of the island.
