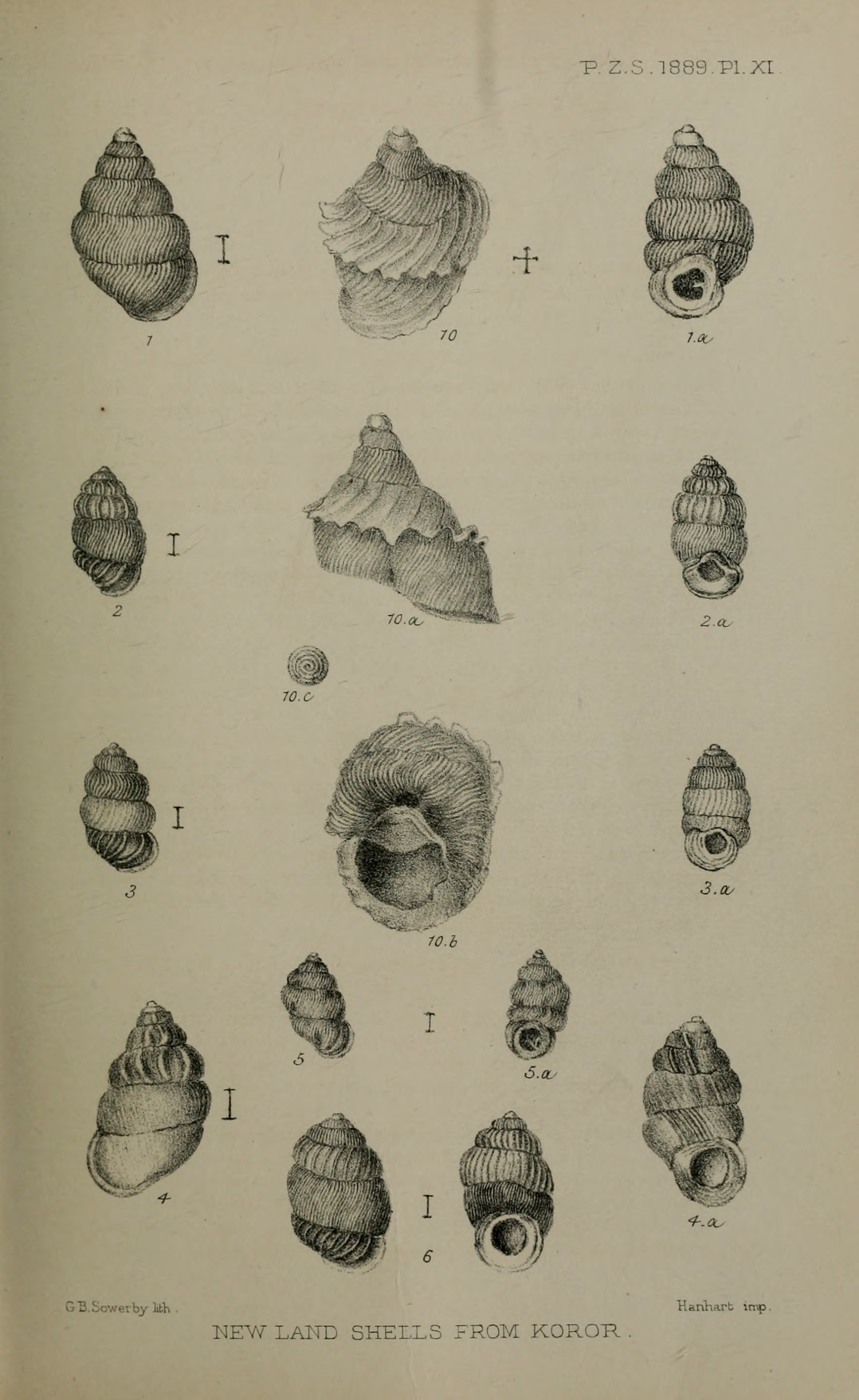
- Hungerfordia pelewensis (figure 10)

Conservation status
- Endangered (IUCN 3.1)

Scientific classification
- Kingdom: Animalia
- Phylum: Mollusca
- Class: Gastropoda
- Subclass: Caenogastropoda
- Order: Architaenioglossa
- Family: Diplommatinidae
- Genus: Hungerfordia
- Species: H. pelewensis

Binomial name
- Hungerfordia pelewensis R. H. Beddome, 1889

= Hungerfordia pelewensis =

Species of gastropod

Hungerfordia pelewensis is a species of small land snail with an operculum, a terrestrial gastropod mollusk in the family Diplommatinidae. This land snail is endemic to Palau.
