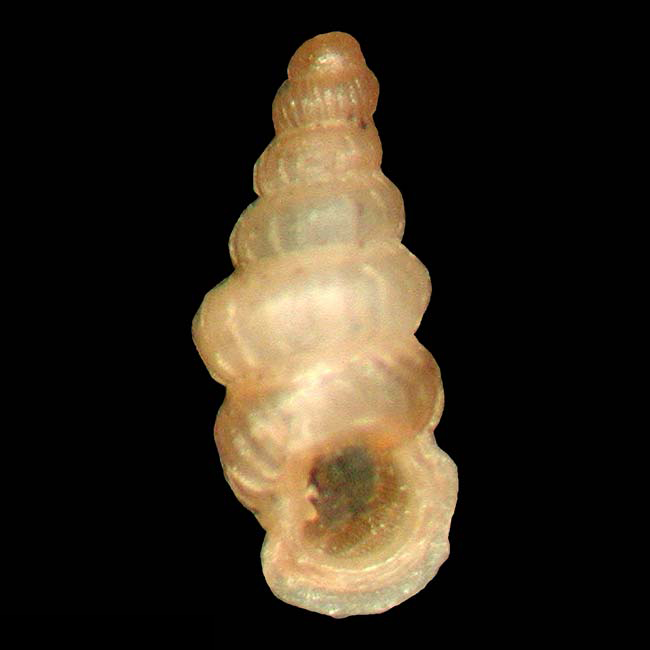

Scientific classification
- Kingdom: Animalia
- Phylum: Mollusca
- Class: Gastropoda
- Subclass: Caenogastropoda
- Order: Architaenioglossa
- Family: Diplommatinidae
- Genus: Diancta
- Species: D. crookshanksi

Binomial name
- Diancta crookshanksi Poppe, Tagaro & Sarino, 2014

= Diancta crookshanksi =

Species of gastropod

Diancta crookshanksi is a species of land snail, a gastropoda mollusc in the family Diplommatinidae.

== Distribution ==
This marine species occurs off the Philippines.
