= Palaina arborfumosa =

Scientific classification
- Domain: Eukaryota
- Kingdom: Animalia
- Phylum: Mollusca
- Class: Gastropoda
- Subclass: Caenogastropoda
- Order: Architaenioglossa
- Superfamily: Cyclophoroidea
- Family: Diplommatinidae
- Genus: Palaina
- Species: P. arborfumosa

Binomial name
- Palaina arborfumosa Shea & Griffiths, 2010
- Location of Lord Howe Island

Species of land snail

Palaina arborfumosa, also known as the Smoking Tree staircase snail, is a species of staircase snail that is endemic to Australia's Lord Howe Island in the Tasman Sea.

== Description ==
The globose pupiform shell of adult snails is 5.6–6.3 mm in height, with a diameter of 3.2–3.5 mm. It is pale golden- to orange-brown in colour, with a conical spire and closely spaced ribs.

== Habitat ==
The snail is most common in the central part of the island, especially Intermediate Hill, Smoking Tree Ridge and Soldier's Creek, with a few records from elsewhere.
