= Diplommatina inflatula =

Conservation status
- Endangered (IUCN 3.1)

Scientific classification
- Kingdom: Animalia
- Phylum: Mollusca
- Class: Gastropoda
- Subclass: Caenogastropoda
- Order: Architaenioglossa
- Family: Diplommatinidae
- Genus: Diplommatina
- Species: D. inflatula

Binomial name
- Diplommatina inflatula (Crosse, 1866)

Species of gastropod

Diplommatina inflatula is a species of land snail with an operculum, terrestrial gastropod mollusc in the family Diplommatinidae.

This species is endemic to Palau.
