= Diplommatina lateralis =

Conservation status
- Data Deficient (IUCN 2.3)

Scientific classification
- Kingdom: Animalia
- Phylum: Mollusca
- Class: Gastropoda
- Subclass: Caenogastropoda
- Order: Architaenioglossa
- Family: Diplommatinidae
- Genus: Diplommatina
- Species: D. lateralis

Binomial name
- Diplommatina lateralis Pilsbry & Hirase, 1904

Species of gastropod

Diplommatina lateralis is a species of land snails with an operculum, terrestrial gastropod mollusks in the family Diplommatinidae.

This species is endemic to Japan.
