= Palaina embra =

Scientific classification
- Domain: Eukaryota
- Kingdom: Animalia
- Phylum: Mollusca
- Class: Gastropoda
- Subclass: Caenogastropoda
- Order: Architaenioglossa
- Superfamily: Cyclophoroidea
- Family: Diplommatinidae
- Genus: Palaina
- Species: P. embra

Binomial name
- Palaina embra Iredale, 1944
- Location of Lord Howe Island

Species of land snail

Palaina embra, also known as the mountain-top staircase snail, is a species of staircase snail that is endemic to Australia's Lord Howe Island in the Tasman Sea.

== Description ==
The pupiform shell of adult snails is 3 mm in height, with a diameter of 1.8 mm. It is white in colour, with golden-brown apical whorls and impressed sutures. It has strong, widely spaced, axal ribs. The umbilicus is closed. The circular aperture has a weakly reflected lip and an operculum is present.

== Habitat ==
The snail is most common in the southern mountains of the island.
