= Palaina macgillivrayi =

Scientific classification
- Domain: Eukaryota
- Kingdom: Animalia
- Phylum: Mollusca
- Class: Gastropoda
- Subclass: Caenogastropoda
- Order: Architaenioglossa
- Superfamily: Cyclophoroidea
- Family: Diplommatinidae
- Genus: Palaina
- Species: P. macgillivrayi

Binomial name
- Palaina macgillivrayi (Pfeiff., 1855)
- Location of Lord Howe Island

Species of land snail

Palaina macgillivrayi, also known as Macgillivray's staircase snail, is a species of staircase snail that is endemic to Australia's Lord Howe Island in the Tasman Sea.

== Description ==
The pupiform shell of adult snails is 5.2–6.3 mm in height, with a diameter of 2.9–3.1 mm. It is golden-brown in colour, darker on the final whorl and with a white peripheral band, with widely spaced ribs. The circular aperture has a strongly reflected lip. The animal has a white body with dark grey cephalic tentacles and black eyes.

== Habitat ==
The snail is widespread and common across the island.
