= Diplommatina madaiensis =

Conservation status
- Critically Endangered (IUCN 3.1)

Scientific classification
- Kingdom: Animalia
- Phylum: Mollusca
- Class: Gastropoda
- Subclass: Caenogastropoda
- Order: Architaenioglossa
- Superfamily: Cyclophoroidea
- Family: Diplommatinidae
- Genus: Diplommatina
- Species: D. madaiensis

Binomial name
- Diplommatina madaiensis Vermeulen, 1993

Species of gastropod

Diplommatina madaiensis is a species of land snail with an operculum, terrestrial gastropod mollusc in the family Diplommatinidae.

This species is endemic to Malaysia. Its natural habitat is subtropical or tropical moist lowland forests. It is threatened by habitat loss.
