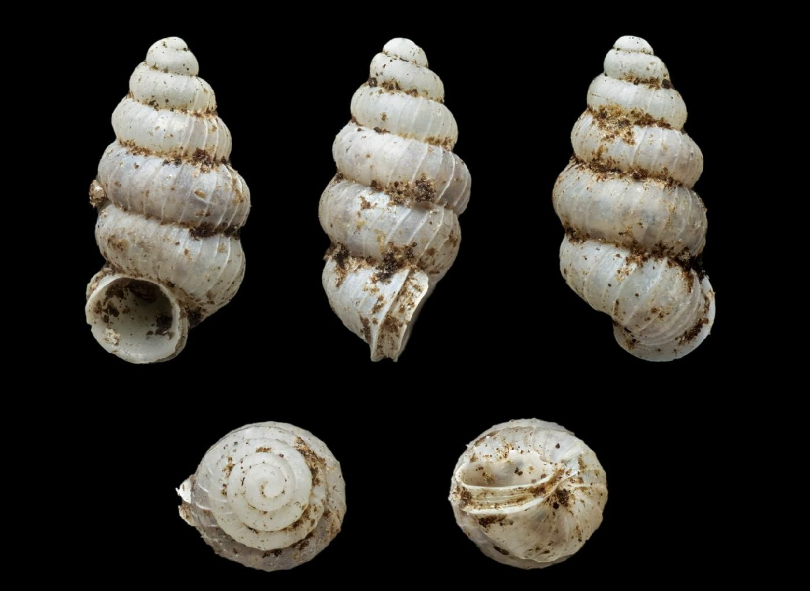
- Shell of Adelopoma occidentale (specimen at the Natural History Museum, London)

Scientific classification
- Kingdom: Animalia
- Phylum: Mollusca
- Class: Gastropoda
- Subclass: Caenogastropoda
- Order: Architaenioglossa
- Family: Diplommatinidae
- Genus: Adelopoma
- Species: A. occidentale

Binomial name
- Adelopoma occidentale (Godwin-Austen, 1886)

Synonyms
- Diplommatina huttoni occidentalis Godwin-Austen, 1886 superseded combination; Diplomatina occidentalis Godwin-Austen, 1886 (original combination); Palaina (Cylindropalaina) occidentalis (Godwin-Austen, 1886) superseded combination; Palaina occidentalis Godwin-Austen, 1886 superseded combination

= Adelopoma occidentale =

Species of gastropod

Adelopoma occidentale is a species of land snail with an operculum, a terrestrial gastropod mollusk in the family Diplommatinidae.

== Description ==
(Original description) The sinistral shell is elongately turreted and scarcely sinuate. Its sculpture has a somewhat distant well marked costulation The colour is white. The spire is rather attenuate and had a blunt apex. The suture is deep. The shell contains six whorls with tumid sides. The body whorl is small, the penultimate whorl much the broadest, those above becoming gradually swollen to the apex. The aperture is small, subvertical and round. The peristome is continuous, closely double. The columellar margin is weak, no tooth, the twist on columella seen within the aperture.

== Distribution ==
This species is found in Trinidad and Tobago and Venezuela.
