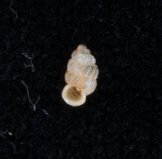

Scientific classification
- Kingdom: Animalia
- Phylum: Mollusca
- Class: Gastropoda
- Subclass: Caenogastropoda
- Order: Architaenioglossa
- Family: Diplommatinidae
- Genus: Adelopoma
- Species: A. paulistanum

Binomial name
- Adelopoma paulistanum (Godwin-Austen, 1886)C. M. Martins & Simone, 2014

= Adelopoma paulistanum =

Species of gastropod

Adelopoma paulistanum is a species of land snail with an operculum, a terrestrial gastropod mollusk in the family Diplommatinidae.

== Distribution ==
This species is found in São Paulo, Brazil.
