= Malarinia calcopercula =

Conservation status
- Data Deficient (IUCN 2.3)

Scientific classification
- Kingdom: Animalia
- Phylum: Mollusca
- Class: Gastropoda
- Subclass: Caenogastropoda
- Order: Architaenioglossa
- Family: Diplommatinidae
- Genus: Malarinia
- Species: M. calcopercula

Binomial name
- Malarinia calcopercula Emberton, 1994

Synonyms
- Hainesia crocea (Sowerby, 1847); Malarinia sp. 1 (Emberton et al., 1996), (Emberton, 1997)

Species of gastropod

Malarinia calcopercula is a species of small land snail with an operculum, a terrestrial gastropod mollusk in the family Diplommatinidae.

== Distribution ==
This land snail is endemic to Madagascar.

== Habitat ==
This species lives in subtropical or tropical dry forests.
