= Diplommatina ringens =

Conservation status
- Critically Endangered (IUCN 3.1)

Scientific classification
- Kingdom: Animalia
- Phylum: Mollusca
- Class: Gastropoda
- Subclass: Caenogastropoda
- Order: Architaenioglossa
- Family: Diplommatinidae
- Genus: Diplommatina
- Species: D. ringens

Binomial name
- Diplommatina ringens (Crosse, 1866)

Synonyms
- Palaina ringens Crosse, 1866

Species of gastropod

Diplommatina ringens is a species of small land snail with an operculum, a terrestrial gastropod mollusc in the family Diplommatinidae. This species is endemic to Palau.
