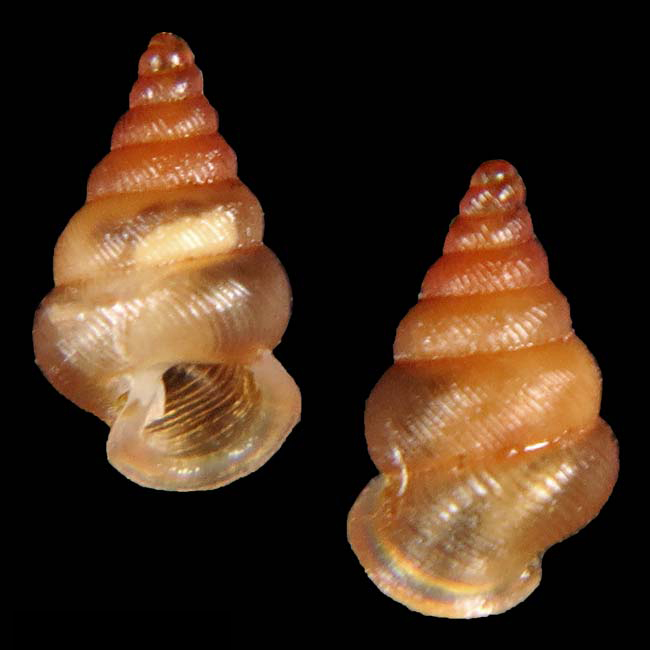

Scientific classification
- Kingdom: Animalia
- Phylum: Mollusca
- Class: Gastropoda
- Subclass: Caenogastropoda
- Order: Architaenioglossa
- Family: Diplommatinidae
- Genus: Diplommatina
- Species: D. lourinae

Binomial name
- Diplommatina lourinae Poppe, Tagaro & Sarino, 2015

= Diplommatina lourinae =

Species of land snail

Diplommatina lourinae is a species of land snail, a gastropoda mollusk in the family Diplommatinidae.
