= Palaina deliciosa =

Scientific classification
- Domain: Eukaryota
- Kingdom: Animalia
- Phylum: Mollusca
- Class: Gastropoda
- Subclass: Caenogastropoda
- Order: Architaenioglossa
- Superfamily: Cyclophoroidea
- Family: Diplommatinidae
- Genus: Palaina
- Species: P. deliciosa

Binomial name
- Palaina deliciosa Iredale, 1944
- Location of Lord Howe Island

Synonyms
- Palaina padda Iredale, 1944

Species of land snail

Palaina deliciosa, also known as the minuscule staircase snail, is a species of staircase snail that is endemic to Australia's Lord Howe Island in the Tasman Sea.

== Description ==
The pupiform shell of adult snails is 1.5 mm in height, with a diameter of 0.9 mm, with deeply impressed sutures. It is white in colour, with golden apical whorls. It has moderately spaced axal ribs. The umbilicus is closed. The circular aperture has an operculum.

== Habitat ==
The snail is common and widespread across the island.
