= Arinia simplex =

Conservation status
- Critically Endangered (IUCN 3.1)

Scientific classification
- Kingdom: Animalia
- Phylum: Mollusca
- Class: Gastropoda
- Subclass: Caenogastropoda
- Order: Architaenioglossa
- Superfamily: Cyclophoroidea
- Family: Diplommatinidae
- Genus: Arinia
- Species: A. simplex

Binomial name
- Arinia simplex Vermeulen, 1996

Species of gastropod

Arinia simplex is a species of small land snails with an operculum, terrestrial gastropod molluscs in the family Diplommatinidae. It is endemic to Malaysia. Its natural habitat is subtropical or tropical moist lowland forests. It is threatened by habitat loss.
