= Diplommatina alata =

Conservation status
- Critically Endangered (IUCN 3.1)

Scientific classification
- Kingdom: Animalia
- Phylum: Mollusca
- Class: Gastropoda
- Subclass: Caenogastropoda
- Order: Architaenioglossa
- Family: Diplommatinidae
- Genus: Diplommatina
- Species: D. alata

Binomial name
- Diplommatina alata (Crosse, 1866)

Synonyms
- Palaina alata Crosse, 1866

Species of gastropod

Diplommatina alata is a species of land snails with an operculum, terrestrial gastropod mollusks in the family Diplommatinidae. This species is endemic to Palau.
