= Diplommatina circumstomata =

Conservation status
- Data Deficient (IUCN 2.3)

Scientific classification
- Kingdom: Animalia
- Phylum: Mollusca
- Class: Gastropoda
- Subclass: Caenogastropoda
- Order: Architaenioglossa
- Superfamily: Cyclophoroidea
- Family: Diplommatinidae
- Genus: Diplommatina
- Species: D. circumstomata

Binomial name
- Diplommatina circumstomata Kuroda & Abe, 1980

Species of land snails

Diplommatina circumstomata is a species of land snail with an operculum, terrestrial gastropod mollusc in the family Diplommatinidae.

This species is endemic to Japan.
