= Palaina taeniolata =

Conservation status
- Data Deficient (IUCN 2.3)

Scientific classification
- Kingdom: Animalia
- Phylum: Mollusca
- Class: Gastropoda
- Subclass: Caenogastropoda
- Order: Architaenioglossa
- Family: Diplommatinidae
- Genus: Palaina
- Species: P. taeniolata

Binomial name
- Palaina taeniolata Quadras & Möllendorff, 1894

Species of gastropod

Palaina taeniolata is a species of small land snail with an operculum, a terrestrial gastropod mollusk or micromollusks in the family Diplommatinidae. This species is endemic to Guam.

== See also ==
List of land snails of the Mariana Islands
