= Palaina levicostulata =

Scientific classification
- Domain: Eukaryota
- Kingdom: Animalia
- Phylum: Mollusca
- Class: Gastropoda
- Subclass: Caenogastropoda
- Order: Architaenioglossa
- Superfamily: Cyclophoroidea
- Family: Diplommatinidae
- Genus: Palaina
- Species: P. levicostulata

Binomial name
- Palaina levicostulata Iredale, 1944
- Location of Lord Howe Island

Species of land snail

Palaina levicostulata, also known as the fine-ribbed staircase snail, is a species of staircase snail that is endemic to Australia's Lord Howe Island in the Tasman Sea.

== Description ==
The conical pupiform shell of adult snails is 4.9–5.1 mm in height, with a diameter of 2.4–2.6 mm and a conical spire. It is very pale to dark golden-brown in colour, sometimes with a white peripheral band on the final whorl. It has fine, closely spaced, axal ribs. The umbilicus is closed. The circular aperture has a strongly reflected lip and an operculum is present. The animal has a white body with dark grey cephalic tentacles and black eyes.

== Habitat ==
The snail is most common in the Settlement region, with a few records from elsewhere on the island.
