= Habeastrum =

Scientific classification
- Kingdom: Animalia
- Phylum: Mollusca
- Class: Gastropoda
- Subclass: Caenogastropoda
- Order: Architaenioglossa
- Family: Diplommatinidae
- Genus: Habeastrum; Luiz Simone, 2019

Genus of gastropods

Habeastrum is a genus of minute diplommatinid pulmonate gastropods, endemic to limestone caves in Mato Grosso do Sul, Brazil. It is represented by two sympatric species, Habeastrum omphalium and Habeastrum parafusum.

This genus has thus far been recorded only from dry material at the type locality of Gruta Pitangueiras (21°06’37”S 56°34’52”W), Bonito, Mato Grosso do Sul, Brazil.

The genus name Habeastrum is derived from the Brazilian diplommatinid genus Habeas, subjected to a diminutive Latin suffix, as a reference to the comparative dimensions of the new genus.
