= Nicida =

Scientific classification
- Kingdom: Animalia
- Phylum: Mollusca
- Class: Gastropoda
- Subclass: Caenogastropoda
- Order: Architaenioglossa
- Family: Diplommatinidae
- Genus: Nicida; W.T. Blanford, 1868

Synonyms
- Diplommatina (Nicida) W. T. Blanford, 1869

Genus of gastropods

Nicida is a genus of air-breathing land snails, terrestrial pulmonate gastropod mollusks in the family Diplommatinidae. These snails are restricted to Western Ghats of India and Sri Lanka.

Three species are recognized.

== Species ==
- Nicida anamallayana (Beddome, 1875)
- Nicida catathymia (Sykes, 1898)
- Nicida ceylanica (Beddome, 1875)
- Nicida delectabilis (Preston, 1905)
- Nicida fairbanki (Blanford, 1868)
- Nicida kingiana (W. T. Blanford & H. F. Blanford, 1861)
- Nicida lankaensis (Preston, 1905)
- Nicida liricincta (Blanford, 1868)
- Nicida nilgirica (W. T. Blanford & H. F. Blanford, 1860)
- Nicida nitidula (Blanford, 1868)
- Nicida pedronis (Beddome, 1875)
- Nicida prestoni (Sykes, 1897)
- Nicida pulneyana (Blanford, 1868)
- Nicida subovata (Beddome, 1875)
