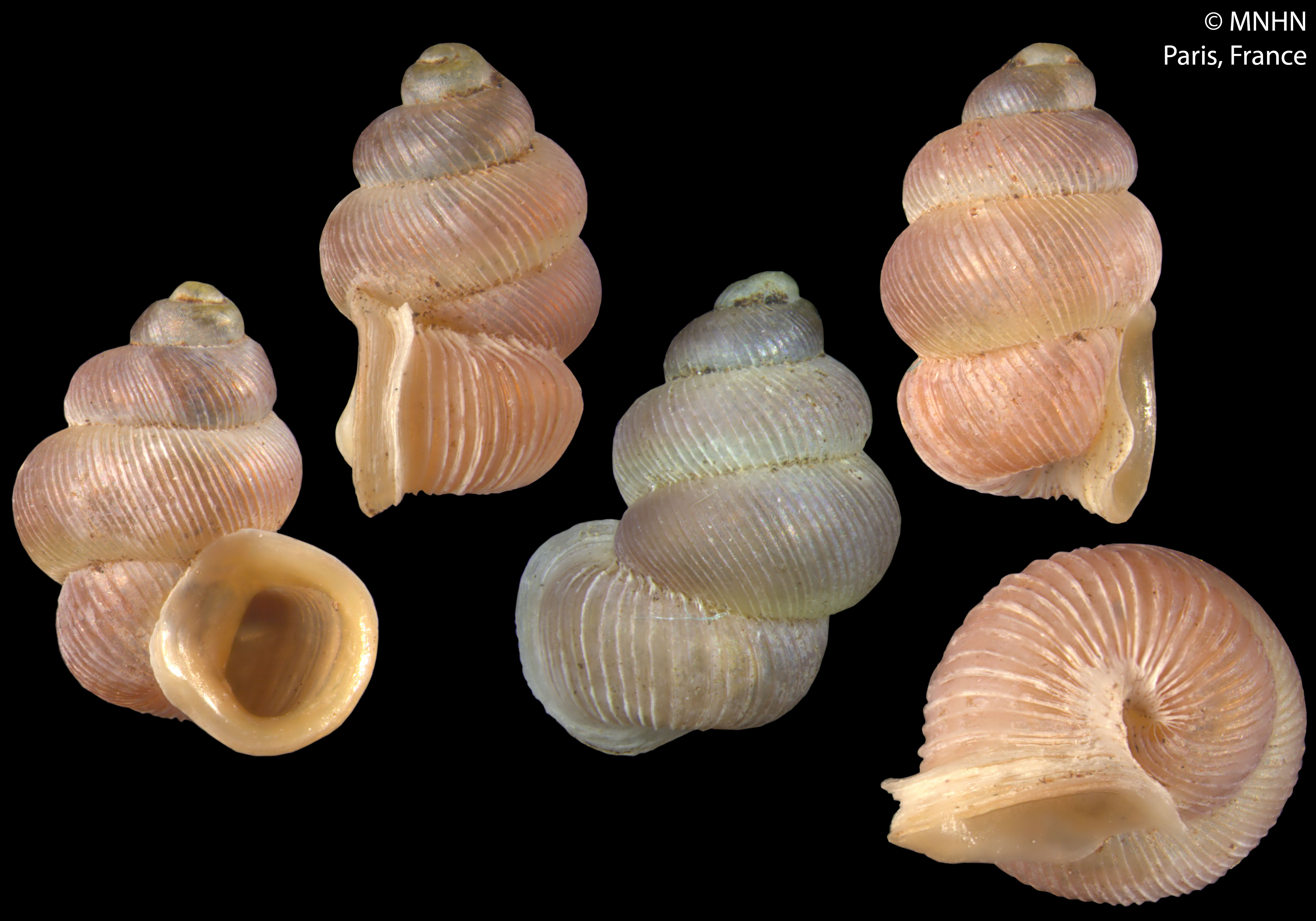
- Shell of Diancta controversa

Scientific classification
- Kingdom: Animalia
- Phylum: Mollusca
- Class: Gastropoda
- Subclass: Caenogastropoda
- Order: Architaenioglossa
- Family: Diplommatinidae
- Genus: Diancta; E. von Martens, 1864

Type species
- Diplommatina constricta Martens, 1864

Synonyms
- Diancta (Diancta) E. von Martens, 1864 (alternate representation); Diplommatina (Diancta) E. von Martens, 1864 (original rank)

= Diancta =

Genus of gastropods

Diancta is a genus of sea snails in the family Diplommatinidae.

== General characteristics ==
(Original description in German) Due to the narrowing of the final two whorls and the localized constriction on the penultimate one, this likely forms a distinct group that could be named Diancta.

== Species ==
Species within the genus Diancta include:

- Diancta aurea Neubert & Bouchet, 2015
- Diancta aurita Neubert & Bouchet, 2015
- Diancta basiplana Neubert & Bouchet, 2015
- Diancta batubacan Nurinsiyah, Prasetia, Mujiono & Heryanto, 2025
- Diancta constricta (Martens, 1864)
- Diancta controversa Neubert & Bouchet, 2015
- Diancta crookshanksi Poppe, Tagaro & Sarino, 2015
- Diancta densecostulata Neubert & Bouchet, 2015
- Diancta dextra Neubert & Bouchet, 2015
- Diancta dilatata Neubert & Bouchet, 2015
- Diancta distorta Neubert & Bouchet, 2015
- Diancta graeffei Möllendorff, 1897
- Diancta halmaherica Greķe, 2017
- Diancta macrostoma (Mousson, 1870)
- Diancta martensi (H. Adams, 1866)
- Diancta multiplicata von Möllendorff, 1902
- Diancta obiensis Greķe, 2017
- Diancta phoenix Bochud, 2021
- Diancta pulchella Neubert & Bouchet, 2015
- Diancta quadrata (Mousson, 1870)
- Diancta rotunda Neubert & Bouchet, 2015
- Diancta subquadrata Neubert & Bouchet, 2015
- Diancta taviensis (Liardet, 1876)
- Diancta torta O. Boettger, 1891
- Diancta trilamellata Neubert & Bouchet, 2015

Species brought into synonymy

- Diancta diepenheimi Preston, 1913: synonym of Palaina diepenheimi (Preston, 1913) (original combination)
- Diancta philippinica Quadras & Möllendorff, 1895: synonym of Paradiancta philippinica (Quadras & Möllendorff, 1895) (original combination)
