= Malarinia =

Scientific classification
- Domain: Eukaryota
- Kingdom: Animalia
- Phylum: Mollusca
- Class: Gastropoda
- Subclass: Caenogastropoda
- Order: Architaenioglossa
- Superfamily: Cyclophoroidea
- Family: Diplommatinidae
- Genus: Malarinia; Haas, 1961

Genus of gastropods

Malarinia is a genus of land snails with an operculum, terrestrial gastropod mollusks in the family Diplommatinidae.

== Species ==
Species within the genus Malarinia include:

- Malarinia calcopercula
