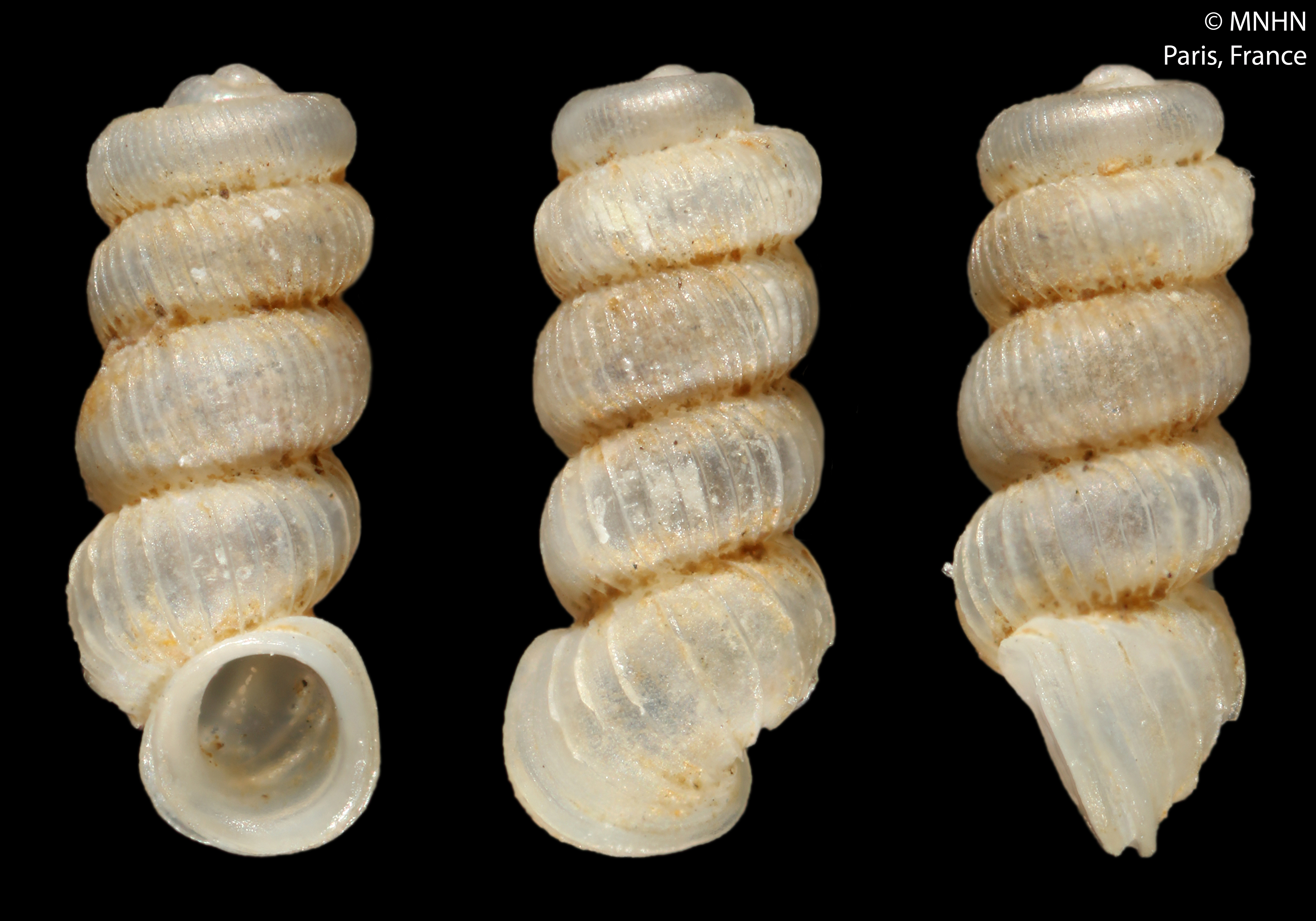
- Shell of Arinia boucheti (holotype at MNHN, Paris)

Scientific classification
- Kingdom: Animalia
- Phylum: Mollusca
- Class: Gastropoda
- Subclass: Caenogastropoda
- Order: Architaenioglossa
- Family: Diplommatinidae
- Genus: Arinia; H. and A. Adams, 1856

Type species
- Cyclostoma minus G. B. Sowerby I, 1843

Genera
- See text

Synonyms
- Arinia (Arinia) H. Adams & A. Adams, 1856· accepted, alternate representation; Arinia (Leucarinia) Möllendorff, 1893· accepted, alternate representation; Diplommatina (Arinia) H. Adams & A. Adams, 1856 (original rank); Euarinia Kobelt & Möllendorff, 1898

= Arinia =

Genus of gastropods

Arinia is a genus of small land snails with an operculum, terrestrial gastropod mollusks in the family Diplommatinidae. The genus was originally described by Henry and Arthur Adams in 1856.

== Species ==
Species within the genus Arina include:

- Arinia angduensis Maassen, 2006
- Arinia ascotrochus Vermeulen, 1996
- Arinia biplicata Vermeulen, 1996
- Arinia blanda E. A. Smith, 1897
- Arinia boreoborneensis Vermeulen, 1996
- Arinia borneensis E. A. Smith, 1894
- Arinia boucheti Páll-Gergely, 2018
- Arinia brevispira Vermeulen, 1996
- Arinia calathiscus Quadras & Möllendorff, 1895
- Arinia chejuensis O.-K. Kwon & J.-S. Lee, 1991
- Arinia chrysacme Möllendorff, 1895
- Arinia clausa Vermeulen, 1996
- Arinia contracta Quadras & Möllendorff, 1895
- Arinia costata Möllendorff, 1887
- Arinia crassiventris B. Rensch, 1931
- Arinia cuspidata Möllendorff, 1894
- Arinia cylindrica Vermeulen, 1996
- Arinia cylindrus Quadras & Möllendorff, 1895
- Arinia dentifera Vermeulen, 1996
- Arinia devians Möllendorff, 1887
- Arinia dichroa Möllendorff, 1895
- Arinia dilatata Maassen, 2003;
- Arinia dioryx Vermeulen, 1996
- Arinia distorta Vermeulen, 1996
- Arinia ferecognita Vermeulen, 1996
- Arinia gibbosula Möllendorff, 1895
- Arinia japonica Pilsbry & Y. Hirase, 1903
- Arinia loumboensis Maassen, 2006
- Arinia micro Marzuki & Foon, 2016
- Arinia minus (G. B. Sowerby I, 1843)
- Arinia minutior Möllendorff, 1894
- Arinia minutissima Möllendorff, 1887
- Arinia monopleuris Quadras & Möllendorff, 1896
- Arinia obesa Vermeulen, 1996
- Arinia oviformis Vermeulen, 1996
- Arinia ovulum Möllendorff, 1896
- Arinia palainaeformis Rensch, 1931
- Arinia pallida Möllendorff, 1896
- Arinia paricostata Vermeulen, 1996
- Arinia patagiata Benthem Jutting, 1958
- Arinia pertusa Vermeulen, 1996
- Arinia plagiostoma Möllendorff, 1894
- Arinia pseudopomatias (Gredler, 1902)
- Arinia saeperobustior Vermeulen, 1996
- Arinia scalatella Dohrn, 1862
- Arinia similis E. A. Smith, 1893
- Arinia simplex Vermeulen, 1996
- Arinia sinulabris Möllendorff, 1894
- Arinia stenotrochus Vermeulen, 1996
- Arinia streptaxiformis Vermeulen, 1996
- Arinia strophostoma Vermeulen, 1996
- Arinia talautana (Fulton, 1899)
- Arinia tjendanae B. Rensch, 1931
- Arinia turgida Vermeulen, 1996
- Arinia valkenburgi Vermeulen, 1996
- Arinia yanseni Nurinsiyah & Hausdorf, 2017
