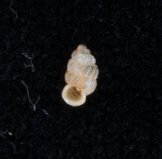

Scientific classification
- Kingdom: Animalia
- Phylum: Mollusca
- Class: Gastropoda
- Subclass: Caenogastropoda
- Order: Architaenioglossa
- Superfamily: Cyclophoroidea
- Family: Diplommatinidae
- Genus: Adelopoma; Doering, 1885
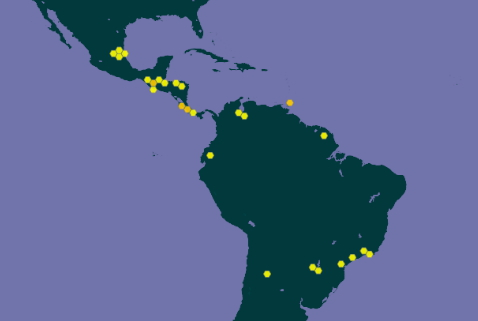

Synonyms
- Palaina (Adelopoma) Doering, 1885 (unaccepted rank)

= Adelopoma =

Genus of gastropods

Adelopoma is a genus of land snails that have an operculum and a gill, terrestrial gastropod mollusks in the family Diplommatinidae.

== Species ==
Species within the genus Adelopoma include:

- Adelopoma bakeri Bartsch & J. P. E. Morrison, 1942
- Adelopoma brasiliense Morretes, 1954
- Adelopoma costaricense Bartsch & J. P. E. Morrison, 1942
- Adelopoma gracile Greķe, 2023
- Adelopoma occidentale (Godwin-Austen, 1886)
- Adelopoma paraguayanum (Parodiz, 1944)
- Adelopoma paulistanum Martins & Simone, 2014
- Adelopoma peruvianum Hausdorf & Munoz, 2004
- Adelopoma stolli Martens, 1890
- Adelopoma tucma Doering, 1885

Synonyms

- Adelopoma limense (R. A. Philippi, 1867): synonym of Pupoides paredesii (A. d'Orbigny, 1835) (junior subjective synonym)
- † Adelopoma martensi Andreae, 1902 : synonym of † Occidentina martensi (Andreae, 1902) (superseded combination)
- Adelopoma paraguayana Parodiz, 1944: synonym of Adelopoma paraguayanum (Parodiz, 1944) (incorrect grammatical agreement of specific epithet)
