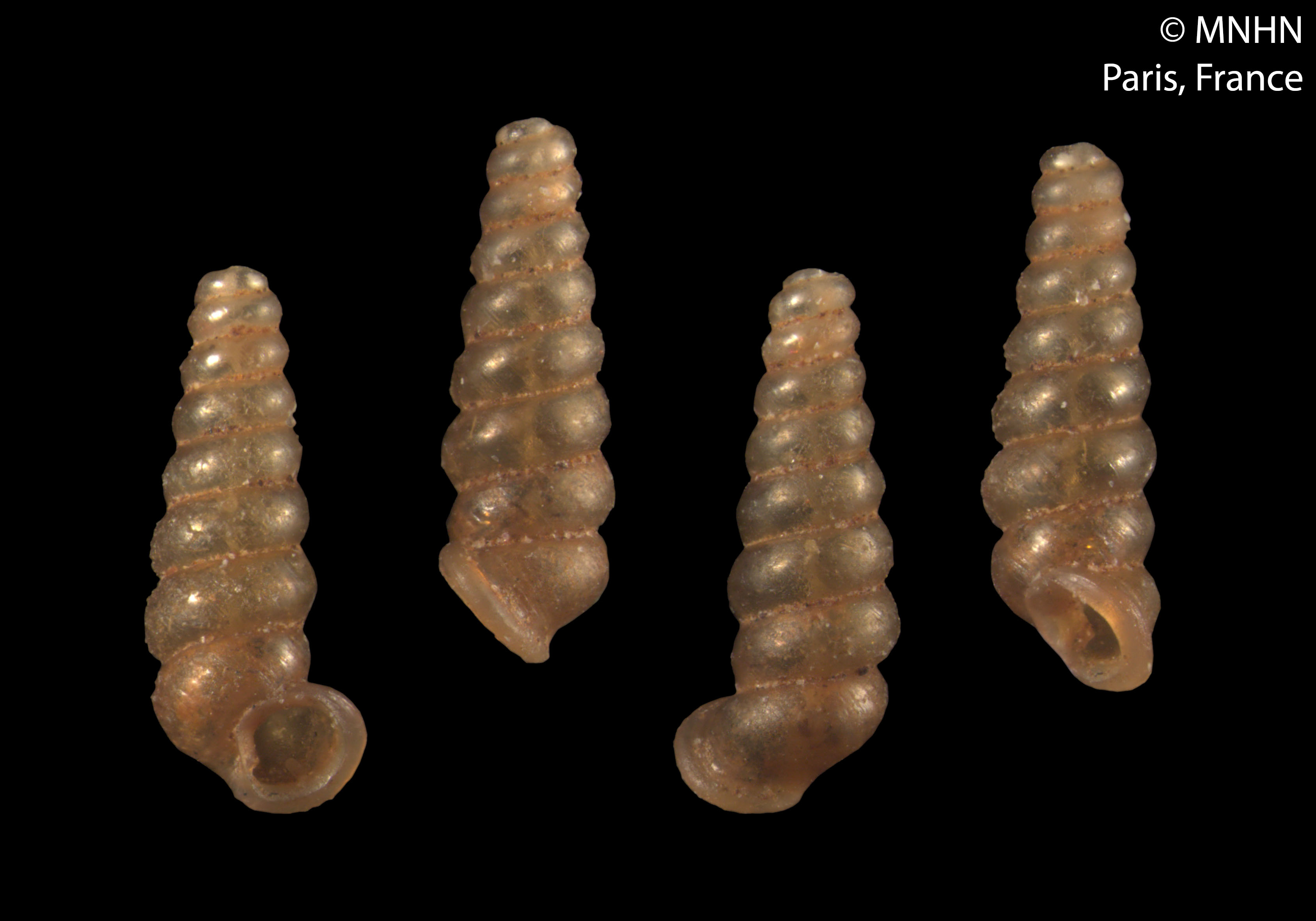
- Shell of Moussonia acuta (holotype at MNHN, Paris)

Scientific classification
- Kingdom: Animalia
- Phylum: Mollusca
- Class: Gastropoda
- Subclass: Caenogastropoda
- Order: Architaenioglossa
- Superfamily: Cyclophoroidea
- Family: Diplommatinidae
- Genus: Moussonia; O. Semper, 1865

Type species
- Pupa problematica Mousson, 1865

Synonyms
- Diplommatina (Moussonia) O. Semper, 1865

= Moussonia (gastropod) =

Genus of gastropods

Moussonia is a genus of land snails with an operculum, terrestrial gastropod molluscs in the family Diplommatinidae.

== Species ==
Species within the genus Moussonia include:

- Moussonia acuta Neubert & Bouchet, 2015
- Moussonia ahena Preston, 1913
- Moussonia barkeri Neubert & Bouchet, 2015
- Moussonia brodieae Neubert & Bouchet, 2015
- Moussonia echinata Greķe, 2017
- Moussonia fuscula (Mousson, 1870)
- Moussonia hirsuta (Zilch, 1953)
- Moussonia hyponepia (van Benthem Jutting, 1958)
- Moussonia longipalatalis Neubert & Bouchet, 2015
- Moussonia manuselae Greķe, 2017
- Moussonia minutissima Neubert & Bouchet, 2015
- Moussonia monstrificabilis Greķe, 2017
- Moussonia obesa Neubert & Bouchet, 2015
- Moussonia omias (van Benthem Jutting, 1958)
- Moussonia papuana Tapparone Canefri, 1883
- Moussonia polita Neubert & Bouchet, 2015
- Moussonia problematica (Mousson, 1865)
- Moussonia pseudoseparanda Greķe, 2017
- Moussonia separanda Greķe, 2017
- Moussonia strubelli (O. Boettger, 1891)
- Moussonia torricelli Greķe, 2017
- Moussonia uncinata Neubert & Bouchet, 2015
- Moussonia vitiana (Mousson, 1870)
- Moussonia vitianoides Neubert & Bouchet, 2015

Species brought into synonymy

- Moussonia apicina Gredler, 1885: synonym of Diplommatina apicina (Gredler, 1885) (original combination)
- Moussonia paxillus Gredler, 1881: synonym of Diplommatina paxillus paxillus (Gredler, 1881) (original combination)
- Moussonia typica O. Semper, 1865: synonym of Moussonia problematica (Mousson, 1865) (unnecessary substitute name)
