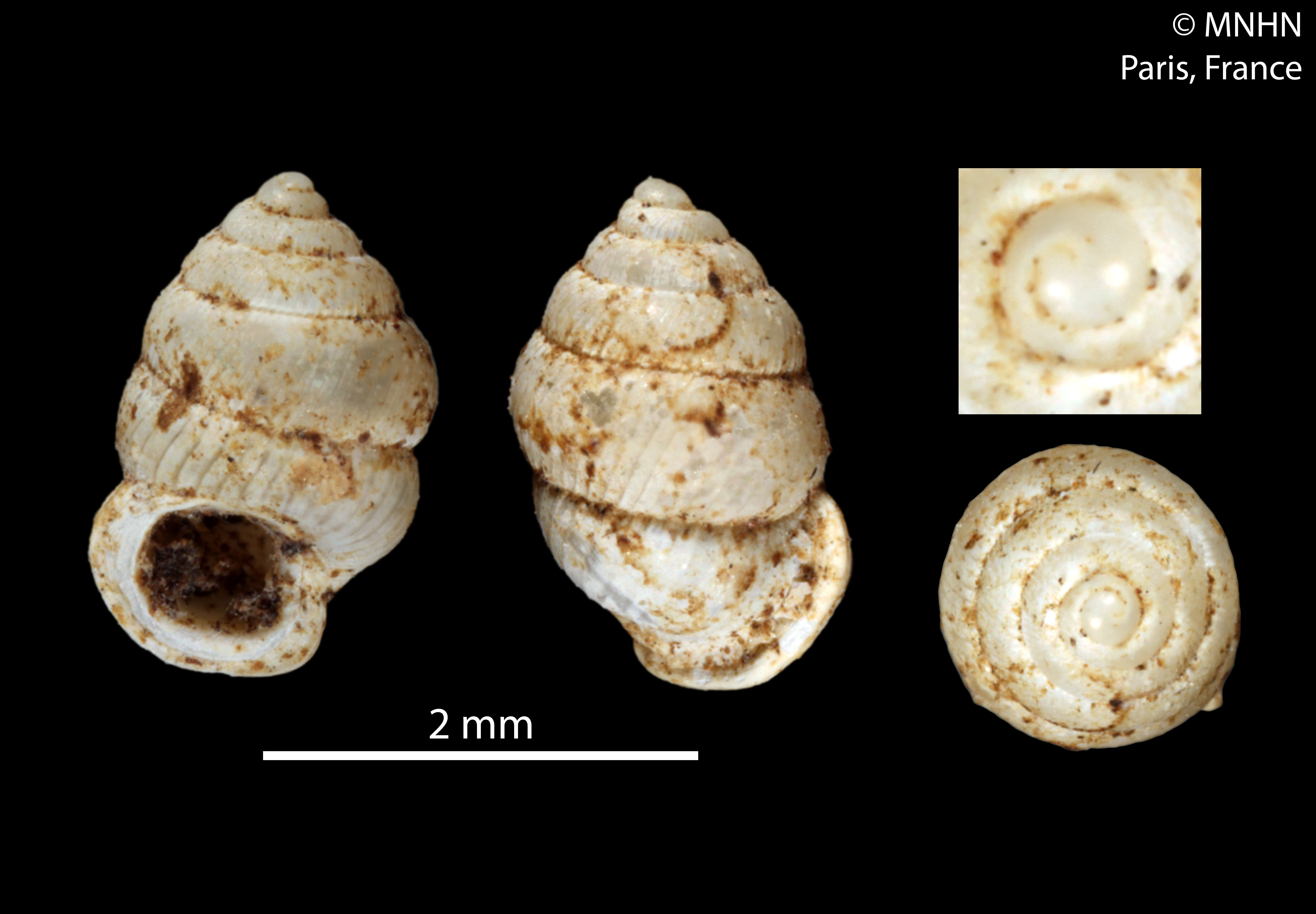
- Diplommatina bonensis shells (paratype at MNHN, Paris)

Scientific classification
- Kingdom: Animalia
- Phylum: Mollusca
- Class: Gastropoda
- Subclass: Caenogastropoda
- Order: Architaenioglossa
- Family: Diplommatinidae
- Genus: Diplommatina; Benson, 1849

Type species
- Bulimus folliculus L. Pfeiffer, 1846

Species
- See text

Synonyms
- Diplommatina (Angigaster) Pilsbry & Hirase, 1904· accepted, alternate representation; Diplommatina (Diplommatina) Benson, 1849· accepted, alternate representation; Diplommatina (Diploptychia) Möllendorff, 1895· accepted, alternate representation; Diplommatina (Eudiplommatina) Kobelt & Möllendorff, 1898; Diplommatina (Metadiancta) Möllendorff, 1898· accepted, alternate representation; Diplommatina (Sinica) Möllendorff, 1885· accepted, alternate representation; Euadnita Iredale, 1941; Eudiplommatina Kobelt & Möllendorff, 1898

= Diplommatina =

Genus of gastropods

Diplommatina is a genus of land snails with an operculum, terrestrial gastropod mollusks in the family Diplommatinidae.

This genus includes hundreds of described species and several subgenera. Species in this genus are mainly from southern Asia.

== Species ==
Species within the genus Diplommatina include:

- Diplommatina abbreviata Heude, 1885
- Diplommatina abiesiana Budha & Naggs, 2017
- Diplommatina acme Laidlaw, 1949
- Diplommatina aculus Möllendorff, 1894
- Diplommatina adversa (Adam & Adams, 1851)
- Diplommatina aetarum Zilch, 1953
- Diplommatina akirai Chang & Ookubo, 1998
- Diplommatina akron Panha & J. B. Burch, 1998
- Diplommatina alata
- Diplommatina aldrichi Godwin-Austen, 1890
- Diplommatina ampla Pilsbry, 1902
- Diplommatina amurensis Mousson, 1887
- Diplommatina angulata Stanisic, 2010
- Diplommatina angulifera Bavay & Dautzenberg, 1912
- Diplommatina antheae Vermeulen, 1993
- Diplommatina apicina (Gredler, 1885)
- Diplommatina asynaimos Vermeulen, 1993
- Diplommatina atauroensis Köhler & Kessner, 2020
- Diplommatina attenuata Laidlaw, 1949
- Diplommatina aurea
- Diplommatina auriculata Möllendorff, 1897
- Diplommatina aurisdiaboli Vermeulen, 1993
- Diplommatina austeni Blanford, 1868
- Diplommatina azlani Marzuki, 2019
- Diplommatina balerica Quadras & Möllendorff, 1896
- Diplommatina baliana Fulton, 1899
- Diplommatina baritensis E. A. Smith, 1893
- Diplommatina beccarii Issel, 1874
- Diplommatina beckmanni Maassen, 2007
- Diplommatina belonis Möllendorff, 1900
- Diplommatina bicolor Möllendorff, 1887
- Diplommatina bicoronata Martens, 1884
- Diplommatina bidentata Vermeulen, Liew & Schilthuizen, 2015
- Diplommatina bifissurata Bavay & Dautzenberg, 1912
- Diplommatina blanfordiana Benson, 1860
- Diplommatina boessnecki Walther & Hausdorf, 2020
- Diplommatina boettgeri Möllendorff, 1887
- Diplommatina boholensis Quadras & Möllendorff, 1896
- Diplommatina bonensis Maassen, 2007
- Diplommatina boucheti Maassen, 2007
- Diplommatina breviplica Möllendorff, 1893
- Diplommatina brunonis E. A. Smith, 1895
- Diplommatina burleyi Maassen, 2007
- Diplommatina busanensis Godwin-Austen, 1889
- Diplommatina cacuminulus Vermeulen, 1993
- Diplommatina cagayanica Möllendorff, 1893
- Diplommatina calcarata Möllendorff, 1897
- Diplommatina calvula Vermeulen, 1993
- Diplommatina canaliculata Möllendorff, 1887
- Diplommatina canarica Beddome, 1875
- Diplommatina cebuensis Möllendorff, 1887
- Diplommatina celebensis Maassen, 2007
- Diplommatina centralis Vermeulen, 1993
- Diplommatina chaoi C.-C. Hwang, K.-M. Chang & H.-W. Chang, 2001
- Diplommatina chejuensis O.-K. Kwon & J.-S. Lee, 1991
- Diplommatina chrysostoma E. A. Smith, 1897
- Diplommatina circumstomata Kuroda & Abe, 1980
- Diplommatina clausilioides Bavay & Dautzenberg, 1912
- Diplommatina collarifera Schmacker & Boettger, 1890
- Diplommatina concavospira Möllendorff, 1894
- Diplommatina concinna H. Adams, 1872
- Diplommatina concolor Quadras & Möllendorff, 1893
- Diplommatina conditioria Maassen, 2007
- Diplommatina confusa Heude, 1885
- Diplommatina congener E. A. Smith, 1894
- Diplommatina conica Möllendorff, 1885
- Diplommatina consularis Gredler, 1886
- Diplommatina contracta Möllendorff, 1886
- Diplommatina crassa Pilsbry, 1901
- Diplommatina crassilabris
- Diplommatina crispata Stoliczka, 1871
- Diplommatina cristata Gredler, 1887
- Diplommatina crosseana Godwin-Austen & Nevill, 1879
- Diplommatina crystallodes Quadras & Möllendorff, 1896
- Diplommatina cyclostoma Möllendorff, 1897
- Diplommatina cyrtochilus Quadras & Möllendorff, 1895
- Diplommatina cyrtorhitis Vermeulen, 1993
- Diplommatina dandanensis Kuroda, 1941
- Diplommatina danzyonarium Kuroda, 1973
- Diplommatina decapitata Vermeulen, Luu, Theary & Anker, 2019
- Diplommatina decaryi Bavay & Germain, 1920
- Diplommatina decipiens Zilch, 1953
- Diplommatina decollata van Benthem Jutting, 1958
- Diplommatina demorgani Laidlaw, 1949
- Diplommatina diminuta Möllendorff, 1891
- Diplommatina diplocheilus Benson, 1857
- Diplommatina diploloma Quadras & Möllendorff, 1895
- Diplommatina diplostoma Rensch, 1931
- Diplommatina doichiangdao Panha & J. B. Burch, 1998
- Diplommatina dormitor Pilsbry, 1902
- Diplommatina dumogaensis Maassen, 2007
- Diplommatina duplicilabra van Benthem Jutting, 1948
- Diplommatina electa Fulton, 1905
- Diplommatina elegans Möllendorff, 1890
- Diplommatina elegantissima Quadras & Möllendorff, 1895
- Diplommatina elisabethae Möllendorff, 1887
- Diplommatina everetti E. A. Smith, 1893
- Diplommatina evexa Vermeulen, 1993
- Diplommatina excentrica E. A. Smith, 1893
- Diplommatina exilis W. T. Blanford, 1863
- Diplommatina exserta Godwin-Austen, 1886
- Diplommatina ferrumequinum Vermeulen, 1993
- Diplommatina filicostata Möllendorff, 1893
- Diplommatina fistulata Budha & Naggs, 2017
- Diplommatina floresiana E. A. Smith, 1897
- Diplommatina floris B. Rensch, 1931
- Diplommatina fluminis B. Rensch, 1931
- Diplommatina folliculus (L. Pfeiffer, 1846)
- Diplommatina fulva Möllendorff, 1901
- Diplommatina futilis Gredler, 1887
- Diplommatina germaini Bavay & Dautzenberg, 1912
- Diplommatina gibbera Pilsbry & Hirase, 1904
- Diplommatina gibberosa Godwin-Austen, 1892
- Diplommatina gibboni
- Diplommatina gibbosa Blanford, 1868
- Diplommatina godawariensis Budha & Naggs, 2017
- Diplommatina godwini Möllendorff, 1898
- Diplommatina goliath Vermeulen, 1996
- Diplommatina gomantongensis E. A. Smith, 1894
- Diplommatina goniocampta Quadras & Möllendorff, 1895
- Diplommatina gonostoma Möllendorff, 1894
- Diplommatina gotoensis Pilsbry & Hirase, 1908
- Diplommatina gracilis Beddome, 1875
- Diplommatina halimunensis Nurinsiyah & Hausdorf, 2017
- Diplommatina heryantoi Nurinsiyah & Hausdorf, 2017
- Diplommatina herziana Möllendorff, 1886
- Diplommatina heteroglypha van Benthem Jutting, 1948
- Diplommatina heteropleura Vermeulen & Khalik, 2021
- Diplommatina hidaensis Ogaito & Ieyama, 1997
- Diplommatina hidagai Panha, 1998
- Diplommatina huangi Ueng & Wang, 2005
- Diplommatina hungerfordiana Nevill, 1881
- Diplommatina hypipamee Stanisic, 2010
- Diplommatina immersidens Pilsbry & Hirase, 1904
- Diplommatina inermis Gredler, 1887
- Diplommatina inferocuspis J.-C. Lee & W.-L. Wu, 2005
- Diplommatina inflatula
- Diplommatina insularis Tongkerd & Panha, 2013
- Diplommatina insularum Pilsbry, 1901
- Diplommatina intermedia Heude, 1890
- Diplommatina inthanon Panha & J. B. Burch, 2001
- Diplommatina irregularis Möllendorff, 1887
- Diplommatina isolata Maassen, 2007
- Diplommatina isseli Godwin-Austen, 1889
- Diplommatina javana Möllendorff, 1897
- Diplommatina jirasaki Panha, Kanchanasaka & J. B. Burch, 2002
- Diplommatina jonabletti Greķe, 2017
- Diplommatina kakenca Nurinsiyah & Hausdorf, 2017
- Diplommatina karenkoensis Kuroda, 1941
- Diplommatina kewlom Panha & J. B. Burch, 1998
- Diplommatina kiiensis Pilsbry, 1902
- Diplommatina kittelorum Maassen, 2007
- Diplommatina kobelti Pilsbry, 1901
- Diplommatina krabiensis Panha & J. B. Burch, 1998
- Diplommatina kumejimana Pilsbry & Hirase, 1904
- Diplommatina kyobuntoensis Kuroda & Miyanaga, 1943
- Diplommatina kyushuensis Pilsbry & Hirase, 1904
- Diplommatina labiosa Blanford, 1868
- Diplommatina lacrimans Vermeulen, 1993
- Diplommatina laevis Fulton, 1899
- Diplommatina laidlawi Sykes, 1903
- Diplommatina lamellata
- Diplommatina lateralis Pilsbry & Hirase, 1904
- Diplommatina latilabris Kobelt, 1886
- Diplommatina lemyrei Bavay & Dautzenberg, 1904
- Diplommatina lenggongensis Tomlin, 1941
- Diplommatina leptospira Möllendorff, 1897
- Diplommatina leucopsis van Benthem Jutting, 1958
- Diplommatina leytensis Möllendorff, 1893
- Diplommatina ligopleuris Blanford, 1868
- Diplommatina lombockensis E. A. Smith, 1898
- Diplommatina lourinae Poppe, Tagaro & Sarino, 2015
- Diplommatina luchuana Pilsbry, 1901
- Diplommatina lucifuga van Benthem Jutting, 1958
- Diplommatina luodianensis T.-C. Luo, D.-N. Chen & W.-C. Zhou, 2008
- Diplommatina lutea
- Diplommatina lygipleura Vermeulen, 1993
- Diplommatina lyrata (Gould, 1859)
- Diplommatina madaiensis Vermeulen, 1993
- Diplommatina maduana Laidlaw, 1949
- Diplommatina maedai Kuroda, 1941
- Diplommatina maibrat Greķe, 2017
- Diplommatina maipokhariensis Budha & Naggs, 2017
- Diplommatina majapahit Greķe, 2019
- Diplommatina masarangensis P. Sarasin & F. Sarasin, 1899
- Diplommatina masbatica Quadras & Möllendorff, 1895
- Diplommatina megaloptyx Möllendorff, 1894
- Diplommatina meijaardi Vermeulen, 1996
- Diplommatina meratusensis Vermeulen, 1993
- Diplommatina mertoni C. R. Boettger, 1922
- Diplommatina messageri Ancey, 1904
- Diplommatina micropleuris Möllendorff, 1893
- Diplommatina microstoma Möllendorff, 1887
- Diplommatina mindanavica Quadras & Möllendorff, 1895
- Diplommatina miraculumdei Vermeulen, 1993
- Diplommatina miriensis Godwin-Austen, 1917
- Diplommatina moluccensis Greķe, 2017
- Diplommatina moluensis E. A. Smith, 1893
- Diplommatina mongondowensis Maassen, 2007
- Diplommatina munipurensis Godwin-Austen, 1892
- Diplommatina naiyanetri Panha, 1997
- Diplommatina nakashimai Minato, 2015
- Diplommatina natunensis E. A. Smith, 1894
- Diplommatina nesiotica Pilsbry & Hirase, 1909
- Diplommatina nevilli Crosse, 1879
- Diplommatina ngocngai Thach, 2021
- Diplommatina niahensis Godwin-Austen, 1889
- Diplommatina nimanandhi Panha, Kanchanasaka & J. B. Burch, 2002
- Diplommatina nipponensis Möllendorff, 1885
- Diplommatina nishii Yamamoto & K. Uozumi, 1988
- Diplommatina nodifera Möllendorff, 1891
- Diplommatina obliquestriata Maassen, 2007
- Diplommatina occulodentata Chang & Tada, 1997
- Diplommatina oedogaster Vermeulen, 1993
- Diplommatina onyx Fulton, 1901
- Diplommatina ookuboi Chang & Tada, 1997
- Diplommatina oshimae Pilsbry, 1901
- Diplommatina oviformis Fulton, 1901
- Diplommatina pachycheilus Benson, 1857
- Diplommatina parabates Laidlaw, 1949
- Diplommatina patani Greķe, 2017
- Diplommatina paxillus (Gredler, 1881)
- Diplommatina pentaechma Laidlaw, 1949
- Diplommatina perpusilla Möllendorff, 1897
- Diplommatina pilanensis Chang & Tada, 2003
- Diplommatina pilula Chang & Tada, 1998
- Diplommatina pimelodes Möllendorff, 1890
- Diplommatina planicollis Möllendorff, 1897
- Diplommatina plecta Fulton, 1901
- Diplommatina polypleuris
- Diplommatina pongrati Panha, Kanchanasaka & J. B. Burch, 2002
- Diplommatina prakayangensis Panha, 1998
- Diplommatina prava Pilsbry & Hirase, 1905
- Diplommatina prostoma Möllendorff, 1894
- Diplommatina pseudopolita Maassen, 2007
- Diplommatina pseudopomatias Gredler, 1902
- Diplommatina pseudotayalis Y.-C. Lee & K.-M. Chang, 2004
- Diplommatina pudica Pilsbry, 1902
- Diplommatina pullula Benson, 1859
- Diplommatina pupinella Heude, 1885
- Diplommatina puppensis Blanford, 1863
- Diplommatina pyra Heude, 1885
- Diplommatina pyramis
- Diplommatina radiiformis Preston, 1913
- Diplommatina recta E.A. Smith, 1895
- Diplommatina regularis
- Diplommatina riedeli Maassen, 2007
- Diplommatina ringens
- Diplommatina ristiae Nurinsiyah & Hausdorf, 2017
- Diplommatina roebeleni Möllendorff, 1887
- Diplommatina rotundata Saurin, 1953
- Diplommatina rubellaria Zilch, 1953
- Diplommatina rubicunda (Martens, 1864)
- Diplommatina rubra Godwin-Austen, 1889
- Diplommatina rufa Möllendorff, 1882
- Diplommatina rupicola Möllendorff, 1887
- Diplommatina saginata Pilsbry, 1901
- Diplommatina salgharica Budha & Backeljau, 2017
- Diplommatina samuiana Möllendorff, 1894
- Diplommatina satanomisakiensis Habe, 1953
- Diplommatina scalaria Blanford, 1868
- Diplommatina schadenbergi Möllendorff, 1888
- Diplommatina schmackeriana Yen, 1939
- Diplommatina schmidti Martens, 1908
- Diplommatina sculptilis Möllendorff, 1885
- Diplommatina seimundi Laidlaw, 1949
- Diplommatina semisculpta Blanford, 1868
- Diplommatina septentrionalis Pilsbry, 1901
- Diplommatina serempakensis Vermeulen, 1993
- Diplommatina setchuanensis Heude, 1885
- Diplommatina sherfaiensis Godwin-Austen, 1870
- Diplommatina shikokuensis Kuroda, Abe & Habe, 1961
- Diplommatina shishanensis C.-C. Hwang, K.-M. Chang & Tada, 2009
- Diplommatina shivapuriensis Budha & Backeljau, 2017
- Diplommatina shuitianensis C.-C. Hwang, K.-M. Chang & Tada, 2009
- Diplommatina silanensis Maassen, 2007
- Diplommatina silvicola Godwin-Austen, 1886
- Diplommatina sinistra Tomlin, 1938
- Diplommatina sinulabris Möllendorff, 1902
- Diplommatina siriphumi Panha & J. B. Burch, 2001
- Diplommatina skeati Sykes, 1903
- Diplommatina slapcinskyi Greķe, 2017
- Diplommatina smithi Kobelt & Möllendorff, 1898
- Diplommatina solomonensis
- Diplommatina soror Vermeulen, 1993
- Diplommatina sperata W. T. Blanford, 1862
- Diplommatina spinosa Godwin-Austen, 1889
- Diplommatina stenoacron Vermeulen & Khalik, 2021
- Diplommatina stibara Vermeulen, 1993
- Diplommatina streptophora Laidlaw, 1949
- Diplommatina strongyla Vermeulen, 1993
- Diplommatina subcalcarata Möllendorff, 1894
- Diplommatina subcylindrica Möllendorff, 1882
- Diplommatina subglaber Vermeulen, 1992
- Diplommatina subisensis Vermeulen, 1993
- Diplommatina sulcicollis Möllendorff, 1897
- Diplommatina sulphurea E. A. Smith, 1893
- Diplommatina superba Godwin-Austen & Nevill, 1879
- Diplommatina supralamellata Maassen, 2007
- Diplommatina suratensis Panha & J. B. Burch, 1998
- Diplommatina syabrubesiensis Budha & Backeljau, 2017
- Diplommatina sykesi Fulton, 1901
- Diplommatina symmetrica Hedley, 1891
- Diplommatina tablasensis Hidalgo, 1888
- Diplommatina tadai Chang, 1997
- Diplommatina taiwanica Pilsbry & Hirase, 1905
- Diplommatina tammesboltae Maassen, 2007
- Diplommatina tanegashimae Pilsbry, 1901
- Diplommatina tantilla (Gould, 1859)
- Diplommatina tattakaensis Chang, Tada & Hwang, 1999
- Diplommatina tayalis Kuroda, 1941
- Diplommatina telnovi Greķe, 2017
- Diplommatina tenuilabiata Fulton, 1901
- Diplommatina tetragonostoma Möllendorff, 1897
- Diplommatina theobaldi Godwin-Austen, 1886
- Diplommatina thersites Möllendorff, 1890
- Diplommatina thomsoni Godwin-Austen, 1892
- Diplommatina tiara Vermeulen, 1993
- Diplommatina timorensis Greke, 2017
- Diplommatina tonkiniana Jaeckel, 1950
- Diplommatina torajaensis Maassen, 2007
- Diplommatina toretos Vermeulen, 1993
- Diplommatina torokkuensis Chang & Tada, 2003
- Diplommatina torquilla van Benthem Jutting, 1958
- Diplommatina tosana Pilsbry & Hirase, 1904
- Diplommatina tosanella Pilsbry & Hirase, 1904
- Diplommatina triangulata Yen, 1939
- Diplommatina tuberifera Zilch, 1953
- Diplommatina tumens Fulton, 1899
- Diplommatina tungwangorum J.-C. Lee & K.-M. Chang, 2004
- Diplommatina turris Pilsbry, 1901
- Diplommatina turritella Möllendorff, 1894
- Diplommatina tweediei Laidlaw, 1949
- Diplommatina tylocheilos Vermeulen, Liew & Schilthuizen, 2015
- Diplommatina tyosenica Kuroda & Miyanaga, 1939
- Diplommatina ujiinsularis Minato, 1982
- Diplommatina ultima Pilsbry & Hirase, 1909
- Diplommatina ungulata
- Diplommatina unicrenata Godwin-Austen, 1897
- Diplommatina uozumii Minato, 1976
- Diplommatina uzenensis Pilsbry, 1900
- Diplommatina ventriculus Möllendorff, 1891
- Diplommatina ventriosa Pilsbry & Hirase, 1904
- Diplommatina vermeuleni Maassen, 2007
- Diplommatina waigeoensis Greķe, 2017
- Diplommatina welzeni Vermeulen, 1993
- Diplommatina whiteheadi E.A. Smith, 1898
- Diplommatina yakushimae Pilsbry, 1901
- Diplommatina yonakunijimana Pilsbry & Hirase, 1909
