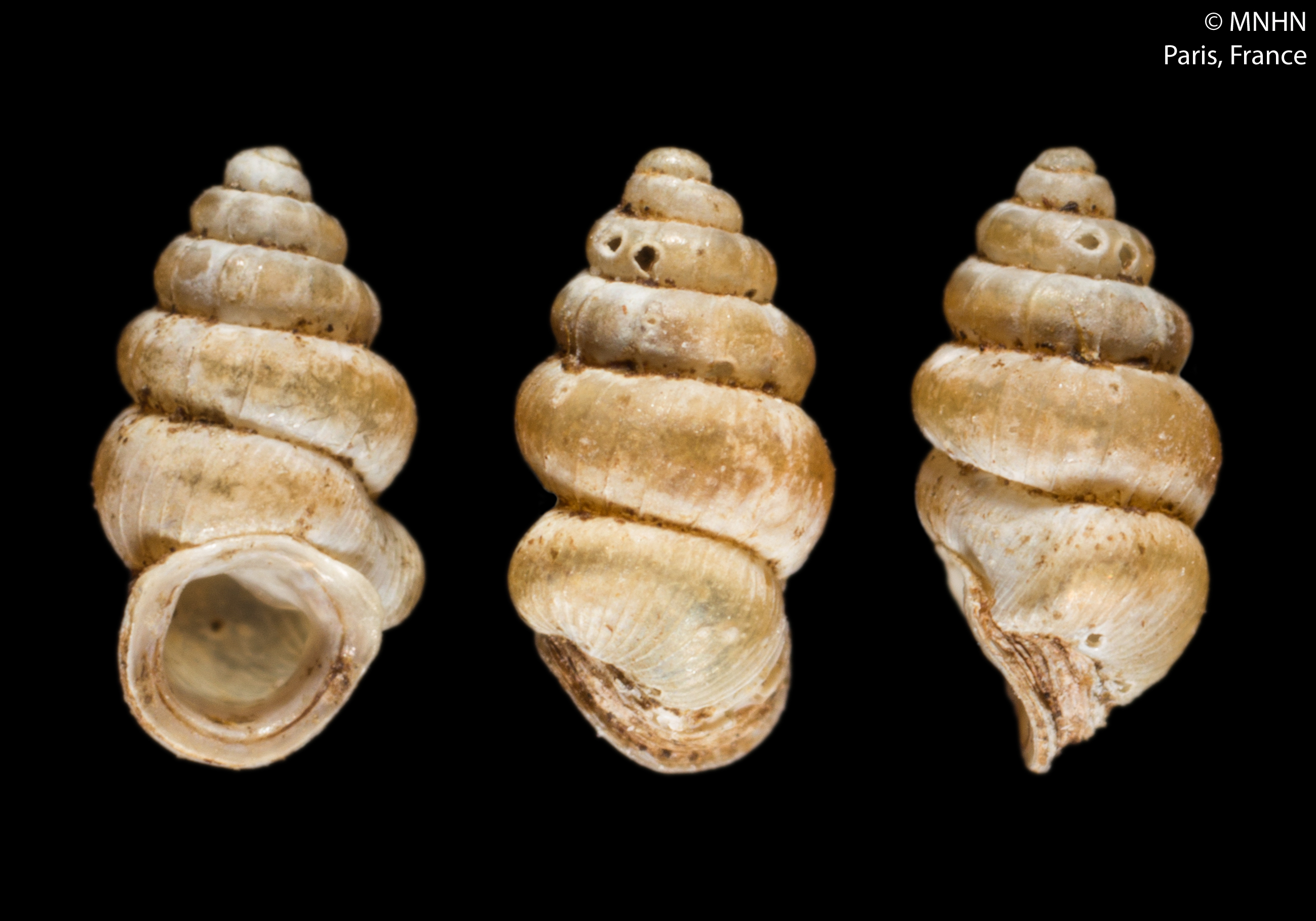
- Shell of Palaina tuberosa (syntype at MNHN, Paris)

Scientific classification
- Kingdom: Animalia
- Phylum: Mollusca
- Class: Gastropoda
- Subclass: Caenogastropoda
- Order: Architaenioglossa
- Superfamily: Cyclophoroidea
- Family: Diplommatinidae
- Genus: Palaina; Semper, 1865

Type species
- Diplommatina macgillivrayi L. Pfeiffer, 1855

Synonyms
- Anostomella E. von Martens, 1867; Diplommatina (Palaina) O. Semper, 1865; Diplommatina (Pseudopalaina) Möllendorff, 1897; Eupalaina Kobelt & Möllendorff, 1898; Macropalaina Möllendorff, 1897; Palaina (Macropalaina) Möllendorff, 1897 (junior synonym); Palaina (Palaina) O. Semper, 1865· accepted, alternate representation; Pupa (Anostomella) E. von Martens, 1867; Pupoidea Pease, 1865

= Palaina =

Genus of gastropods

Palaina is a genus of minute land snails with opercula, terrestrial gastropod mollusks or micromollusks in the family Diplommatinidae.

== Species ==
Species in the genus Palaina include:

- Palaina adelpha Soós, 1911
- Palaina aerari (Dell, 1955)
- Palaina ainaro Köhler & Kessner, 2020
- Palaina albata (Beddome, 1889)
- Palaina alberti Neubert & Bouchet, 2015
- Palaina albrechti Greķe, 2017
- Palaina amurensis (Mousson, 1887)
- Palaina angulata O. Boettger, 1891
- Palaina arborfumosa Shea & Griffiths, 2010
- Palaina ascendens (Mousson, 1870) second junior homonym of Palaina ascendens (E. von Martens, 1864)
- Palaina ascendens (E. von Martens, 1864)
- Palaina astenis Vermeulen, 1997
- Palaina attenboroughi Greķe, 2017
- Palaina bantimurungensis Maassen, 2003
- Palaina beilanensis Preston, 1913
- Palaina bicornis van Benthem Jutting, 1958
- Palaina biroi Soós, 1911
- Palaina boucheti Tillier, 1981
- Palaina bougainvillei Greķe, 2017
- Palaina brandontrani Köhler & Kessner, 2020
- Palaina brazieri (Cox, 1870)
- Palaina bundiana Wiktor, 1998
- Palaina cantori (L. Pfeiffer, 1857)
- Palaina capillacea (Pfeiff., 1855)
- Palaina carbavica O. Boettger, 1891
- Palaina catanduanica Quadras & Möllendorff, 1895
- Palaina cenderawasih Greķe, 2021
- Palaina chalarostoma Quadras & Möllendorff, 1896
- Palaina chrysalis (Möllendorff, 1887)
- Palaina chrysostoma (E. A. Smith, 1897)
- Palaina citrinella van Benthem Jutting, 1963
- Palaina clappi Solem, 1960
- Palaina commixta I. Rensch, 1937
- Palaina consobrina van Benthem Jutting, 1963
- Palaina conspicua Möllendorff, 1893
- Palaina cristata Quadras & Möllendorff, 1893
- Palaina cupulifera van Benthem Jutting, 1963
- Palaina dautzenbergiana (Yen, 1948)
- Palaina deformis Quadras & Möllendorff, 1895
- Palaina deliciosa Iredale, 1944
- Palaina dianctoides Greķe, 2017
- Palaina diepenheimi (Preston, 1913)
- Palaina dimorpha Crosse, 1866
- Palaina doberai Greķe, 2017
- Palaina dohertyi E. A. Smith, 1897
- Palaina dohrni
- Palaina doliolum Möllendorff, 1897
- Palaina edwardi Iredale, 1944
- Palaina embra Iredale, 1944
- Palaina erythropeplos van Benthem Jutting, 1958
- Palaina eumirabilis Zilch, 1953
- Palaina evanescens Greķe, 2021
- Palaina extremita Greķe, 2017
- Palaina flammulata Neubert & Bouchet, 2015
- Palaina flavocylindrica Greķe, 2017
- Palaina floridensis Solem, 1960
- Palaina formosana Pilsbry & Y. Hirase, 1905
- Palaina francoisi Ancey, 1905
- Palaina gardneri Dell, 1955
- Palaina gedeana Möllendorff, 1897
- Palaina glabella Neubert & Bouchet, 2015 (primary homonym - invalid)
- Palaina glabella van Benthem Jutting, 1963
- Palaina godeffroyana (Mousson, 1870)
- Palaina granulum I. Rensch & B. Rensch, 1929
- Palaina hartmanni Greķe, 2017
- Palaina hidalgoi Möllendorff, 1896
- Palaina hyalina Quadras & Möllendorff, 1894
- Palaina iha Greķe, 2017
- Palaina imperfecta Greķe, 2017
- Palaina inconspicua van Benthem Jutting, 1963
- Palaina insulana Greķe, 2017
- Palaina intercollis Shea & Griffiths, 2010
- Palaina kagainisi Greķe, 2021
- Palaina kitteli Neubert & Bouchet, 2015
- Palaina kubaryi Möllendorff, 1897
- Palaina kuniorum Tillier, 1981

* Palaina labeosa Neubert & Bouchet, 2015

- Palaina laszloi Greķe, 2017
- Palaina latecostata (Mousson, 1870)
- Palaina lengguru Greķe, 2017
- Palaina leptotoreutos van Benthem Jutting, 1958
- Palaina levicostulata Iredale, 1944
- Palaina liliputana van Benthem Jutting, 1963
- Palaina louisiade Greķe, 2017
- Palaina lucia Iredale, 1944
- Palaina macgillivrayi (Pfeiff., 1855)
- Palaina mairasiGreķe, 2017
- Palaina manggaraica (B. Rensch, 1931)
- Palaina marchei (Bavay, 1906)
- Palaina mareana Tillier, 1981
- Palaina mariei (Crosse, 1867)
- Palaina megalostoma Greķe, 2017
- Palaina mengen Greķe, 2017
- Palaina minuscularia Greķe, 2017
- Palaina minuta (H. Adams, 1868)
- Palaina minutula Greķe, 2017
- Palaina mirifica Greķe, 2017
- Palaina misoolensis Greķe, 2017
- Palaina modesta Quadras & Möllendorff, 1893
- Palaina moellendorffi (Fulton, 1899)
- Palaina montrouzieri (Crosse, 1874)
- Palaina morongensis Möllendorff, 1890
- Palaina moussoni Crosse, 1866
- Palaina mutis Greķe, 2017
- Palaina nanodes Tillier, 1981
- Palaina nicobarica (Godwin-Austen, 1886)
- Palaina nissidiophila Tillier, 1981
- Palaina novoguineensis E. A. Smith, 1897
- Palaina novopommerana I. Rensch & B. Rensch, 1929
- Palaina nubigena Möllendorff, 1897
- Palaina obesa (Hedley, 1898)
- Palaina obiensis Greķe, 2017
- Palaina onin Greķe, 2017
- Palaina opaoana Tillier, 1981
- Palaina orelimo Köhler & Kessner, 2020
- Palaina ovatula Möllendorff, 1897
- Palaina pagodula (Bavay & Dautzenberg, 1909)
- Palaina pallgergelyi Greķe, 2021
- Palaina papuamontis Greķe, 2017
- Palaina papuanorum Soós, 1911
- Palaina paradisaea Greķe, 2017
- Palaina parietalis Neubert & Bouchet, 2015
- Palaina patula Crosse, 1866
- Palaina paucicostata Pilsbry & Y. Hirase, 1905
- Palaina perroquini (Crosse, 1871)
- Palaina perspectiva Greķe, 2017
- Palaina platycheilus (Beddome, 1889)
- Palaina polystoma B. Rensch, 1931
- Palaina pomatiaeformis (Mousson, 1870)
- Palaina ponsonbyi Sykes, 1903
- Palaina porrecta Möllendorff, 1890
- Palaina propinqua van Benthem Jutting, 1963
- Palaina psittricha Greķe, 2017
- Palaina pumila van Benthem Jutting, 1959
- Palaina pupa Crosse, 1865
- Palaina pusilla Martens, 1877
- Palaina quadrasi (Möllendorff, 1887)
- Palaina quadricornis van Benthem Jutting, 1958
- Palaina repandostoma van Benthem Jutting, 1963
- Palaina rubella (Beddome, 1889)
- Palaina sarmi Greķe, 2021
- Palaina saxatilis Greķe, 2021
- Palaina saxicola (Möllendorff, 1887)
- Palaina scalarina Möllendorff, 1897
- Palaina scaveola van Benthem Jutting, 1958
- Palaina schneideri I. Rensch & B. Rensch, 1929
- Palaina semperi Kobelt, 1902
- Palaina silvicultrix Greķe, 2017
- Palaina slapcinskyi Greķe, 2017
- Palaina solomonensis (Dell, 1955)
- Palaina sparselamellata Greķe, 2017
- Palaina strigata Crosse, 1866
- Palaina striolata Crosse, 1866
- Palaina subregularis (Mousson, 1870)
- Palaina sulcata Neubert & Bouchet, 2015
- Palaina sulcicollis (Möllendorff, 1897)
- Palaina taeniolata Quadras & Möllendorff, 1894
- Palaina tanimbarensis Greķe, 2017
- Palaina telnovi Greķe, 2017
- Palaina thomasrinteleni Greķe, 2017
- Palaina trachelostropha Möllendorff, 1890
- Palaina truncata Neubert & Bouchet, 2015
- Palaina tuba Köhler & Kessner, 2020
- Palaina tuberosa (Mousson, 1870)
- Palaina tuberosissima Neubert & Bouchet, 2015
- Palaina tumens (Fulton, 1899)
- Palaina ulingensis (Möllendorff, 1887)
- Palaina vermeuleni Greķe, 2017
- Palaina vilarensis Zilch, 1953
- Palaina vulcanicola Vermeulen, 1996
- Palaina waigeo Greķe, 2017
- Palaina waterhousei Iredale, 1944
- Palaina wawiyai Greķe, 2017
- Palaina wezendonki Maassen, 2003;
- Palaina wilsoni Crosse, 1866
- Palaina wisemani (Cox, 1870)
- Palaina xiphidium Möllendorff, 1897
- Palaina yamdena Greķe, 2017
