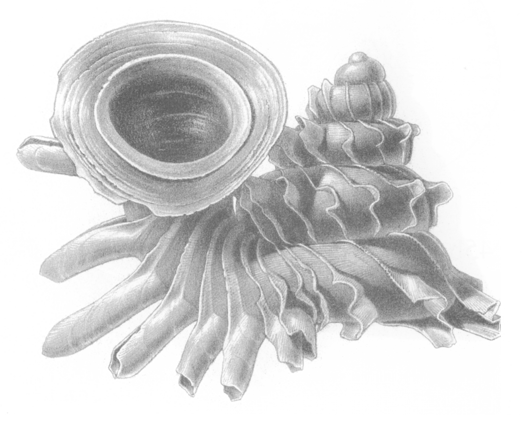
- Drawing of the shell of Plectostoma everetti from Borneo

Scientific classification
- Kingdom: Animalia
- Phylum: Mollusca
- Class: Gastropoda
- Subclass: Caenogastropoda
- Order: Architaenioglossa
- Superfamily: Cyclophoroidea
- Family: Diplommatinidae; Pfeiffer, 1857

Genera
- See text

= Diplommatinidae =

Diplommatinidae Temporal range: Albian–Recent

Family of gastropods

Diplommatinidae is a family of small land snails, also known as staircase snails, with an operculum, terrestrial gastropod mollusks in the superfamily Cyclophoroidea. The Cochlostomatinae Kobelt, 1902, were previously considered a subfamily of the Diplommatinidae, but are now known to be a separate family.

== Genera ==
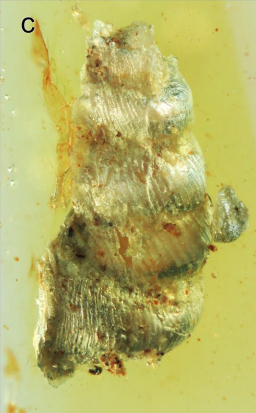
†Euthema hesoana in Burmese amber

Genera included within the Diplommatinidae include:

- Adelopoma Doering, 1885
- Arinia H. Adams & A. Adams, 1856
- Benigoma Kuroda, 1928
- Cardiostoma F. Sandberger, 1870 †
- Clostophis Benson, 1860
- Diancta E. von Martens, 1864
- Diplommatina Benson, 1849
- Eclogarinia Wenz, 1939
- Entypogyra Hrubesch, 1965 †
- Euthema Yu, Wang & Pan, 2018 †
- Fermepalaina Iredale, 1945
- Gastroptychia Kobelt & Möllendorff, 1900
- Habeas Simone, 2013
- Habeastrum Simone, 2019
- Helicomorpha Möllendorff, 1890
- Hungerfordia Beddome, 1889
- Laotia Saurin, 1953
- Luzonocoptis Páll-Gergely & Hunyadi, 2017
- Malarinia Haas, 1961
- Moussonia O. Semper, 1865
- Niahia Vermeulen, 1996
- Nicida W.T. Blanford, 1868
- Notharinia Vermeulen, Phung & Truong, 2007
- Occidentina Harzhauser & Neubauer, 2018 †
- Opisthostoma W. T. Blanford & H. F. Blanford, 1860
- Palaina O. Semper, 1865
- Palmatina Iredale, 1944
- Paradiancta Quadras & Möllendorff, 1895
- Plectostoma H. Adams, 1865
- Pseudonicida Hrubesch, 1965 †
- Pugnellia Oppenheim, 1895 †
- Styx Oppenheim, 1895 †
- Velepalaina Iredale, 1937
