= A. cylindrica =

A. cylindrica may refer to:

- Abida cylindrica, a land snail species
- Acacia cylindrica, a flowering plant species
- Aegilops cylindrica, a grass species
- Afotella cylindrica, a moth species
- Atimura cylindrica, a beetle species
- Amastra cylindrica, a land snail species
- Anemone cylindrica, a flowering plant species
- Apriona cylindrica, a beetle species

== Synonyms ==
- Achillea cylindrica, a synonym of Achillea nobilis, a flowering plant species
