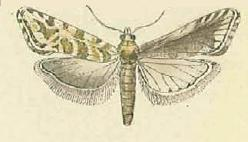

Scientific classification
- Kingdom: Animalia
- Phylum: Arthropoda
- Class: Insecta
- Order: Lepidoptera
- Family: Tortricidae
- Subfamily: Tortricinae
- Tribe: Cochylini
- Genus: Cryptocochylis; Razowski, 1960
- Species: C. conjunctana

Binomial name
- Cryptocochylis conjunctana (Mann, 1864)

Synonyms
- Conchylis conjunctana Mann, 1864; Euxanthis grapholithana Kennel, 1913

= Cryptocochylis =

Monotypic genus of tortrix moths

Cryptocochylis is a genus of moths belonging to the family Tortricidae. It contains only one species, Cryptocochylis conjunctana, which is found in Germany, Italy, Croatia, Hungary, Ukraine, Romania, Bulgaria, North Macedonia, Greece and Asia Minor.

The larvae feed on Achillea nobilis.

== See also ==
- List of Tortricidae genera
