= Apriona sublaevis =

Scientific classification
- Domain: Eukaryota
- Kingdom: Animalia
- Phylum: Arthropoda
- Class: Insecta
- Order: Coleoptera
- Suborder: Polyphaga
- Infraorder: Cucujiformia
- Family: Cerambycidae
- Genus: Apriona
- Species: A. sublaevis

Binomial name
- Apriona sublaevis Thomson, 1878

Synonyms
- Apriona bicolor Kriesche, 1919

Species of beetle

Apriona sublaevis is a species of beetle in the family Cerambycidae. It was described by Thomson in 1878. It is known from Nepal, Vietnam, Myanmar and India.
