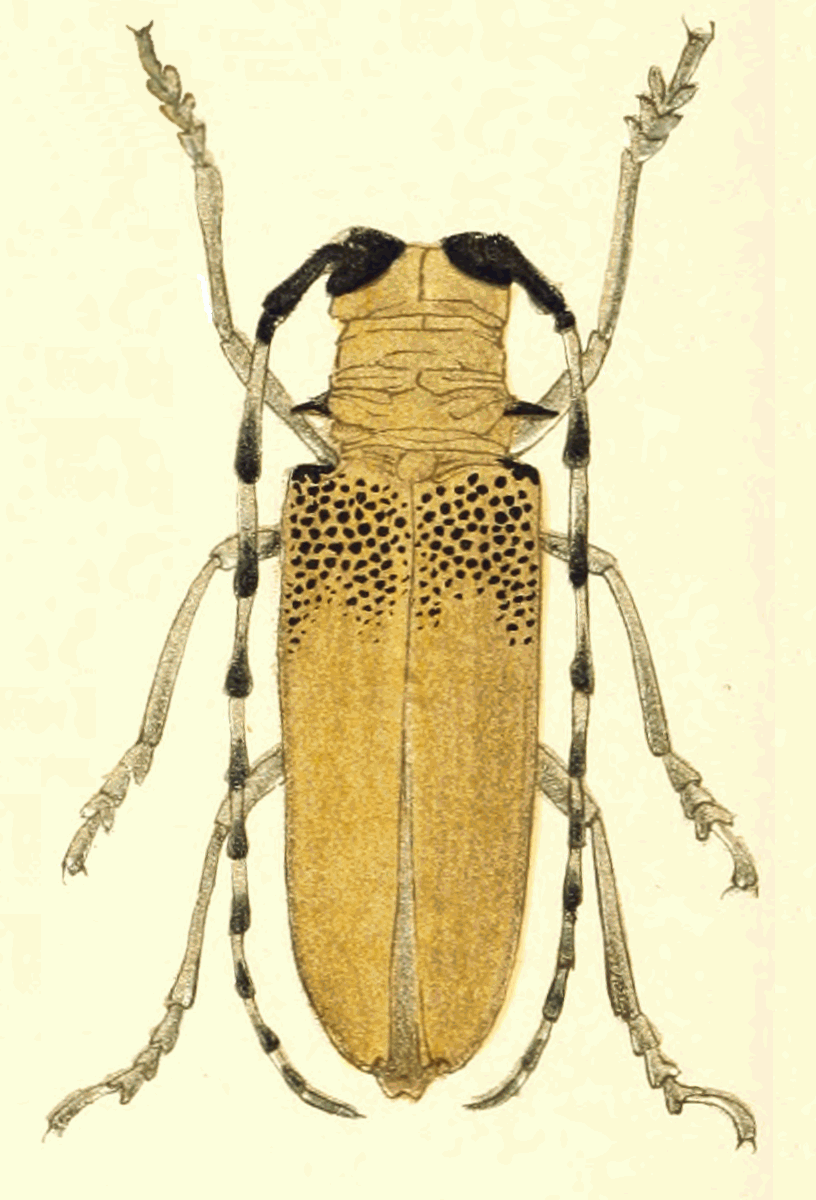
- Apriona rugicollis

Scientific classification
- Domain: Eukaryota
- Kingdom: Animalia
- Phylum: Arthropoda
- Class: Insecta
- Order: Coleoptera
- Suborder: Polyphaga
- Infraorder: Cucujiformia
- Family: Cerambycidae
- Subfamily: Lamiinae
- Tribe: Batocerini
- Genus: Apriona; Chevrolat, 1852

Synonyms
- Cylindrapriona Breuning 1949; Mesapriona Breuning 1949; Humeroapriona Breuning 1949; Parapriona Breuning 1948; Anapriona Breuning 1949

= Apriona =

Genus of beetles

Apriona is a genus of longhorn beetles in the subfamily Lamiinae.

Apriona species are polyphagous and attack many plant species in their areas of origin, including species that are common and important in European forest, public green areas, and fruit tree plantations. The three species considered in this PRA have hosts in 62 different plant species, mostly trees, from the Moraceae, Salicaceae, Rosaceae and Fagaceae families.

== Species ==
The genus contains the following species:

- Apriona ammiralis
- Apriona aphetor
- Apriona brunneomarginata
- Apriona buruensis
- Apriona chemsaki
- Apriona cinerea
- Apriona cylindrica
- Apriona elsa
- Apriona flavescens
- Apriona germari
- Apriona hageni
- Apriona irma
- Apriona jakli
- Apriona jossoi
- Apriona juheli
- Apriona marcusiana
- Apriona minettii
- Apriona moratii
- Apriona multigranula
- Apriona neglecta
- Apriona neglectissima
- Apriona nobuoi
- Apriona novaeguineae
- Apriona pascoei
- Apriona paucigranula
- Apriona punctatissima
- Apriona rixator
- Apriona rugicollis
- Apriona sublaevis
- Apriona submaculosa
- Apriona swainsoni
- Apriona teocchii
- Apriona tigris
- Apriona trilineata
- Apriona tuberosicollis
- Apriona unidentata
- Apriona vagemaculata
