= Atimura =

Scientific classification
- Domain: Eukaryota
- Kingdom: Animalia
- Phylum: Arthropoda
- Class: Insecta
- Order: Coleoptera
- Suborder: Polyphaga
- Infraorder: Cucujiformia
- Family: Cerambycidae
- Tribe: Apomecynini
- Genus: Atimura

Genus of beetles

Atimura is a genus of beetles in the family Cerambycidae, containing the following species:

- Atimura affinis Breuning, 1939
- Atimura apicalis Gahan, 1895
- Atimura bacillina Pascoe, 1863
- Atimura combreti Gardner, 1930
- Atimura cylindrica Gressitt, 1940
- Atimura formosana Matsushita, 1933
- Atimura fulva Schwarzer, 1925
- Atimura japonica Bates, 1873
- Atimura laosica Breuning, 1965
- Atimura minima Breuning, 1939
- Atimura nilghirica Breuning, 1940
- Atimura proxima Breuning, 1939
- Atimura punctissima Pascoe, 1865
- Atimura strandi Breuning, 1940
- Atimura subapicalis Breuning, 1949
- Atimura terminata Pascoe, 1863
