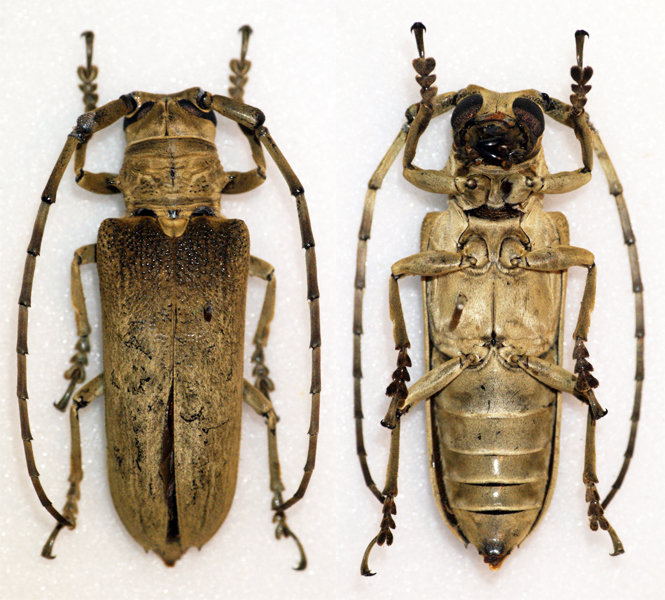

Scientific classification
- Domain: Eukaryota
- Kingdom: Animalia
- Phylum: Arthropoda
- Class: Insecta
- Order: Coleoptera
- Suborder: Polyphaga
- Infraorder: Cucujiformia
- Family: Cerambycidae
- Genus: Apriona
- Species: A. aphetor

Binomial name
- Apriona aphetor (Newman, 1842)

Synonyms
- Apriona latifrons Thomson, 1878

= Apriona aphetor =

Species of beetle

Apriona aphetor is a species of beetle in the family Cerambycidae. It was described by Newman in 1842. It is known from Sumatra and the Philippines.

== Subspecies ==
- Apriona aphetor aphetor (Newman, 1842)
- Apriona aphetor francottei Jiroux, 2011
