= Apriona juheli =

Scientific classification
- Domain: Eukaryota
- Kingdom: Animalia
- Phylum: Arthropoda
- Class: Insecta
- Order: Coleoptera
- Suborder: Polyphaga
- Infraorder: Cucujiformia
- Family: Cerambycidae
- Genus: Apriona
- Species: A. juheli

Binomial name
- Apriona juheli Jiroux, 2011

Species of beetle

Apriona juheli is a species of beetle in the family Cerambycidae. It was described by Jiroux in 2011.
