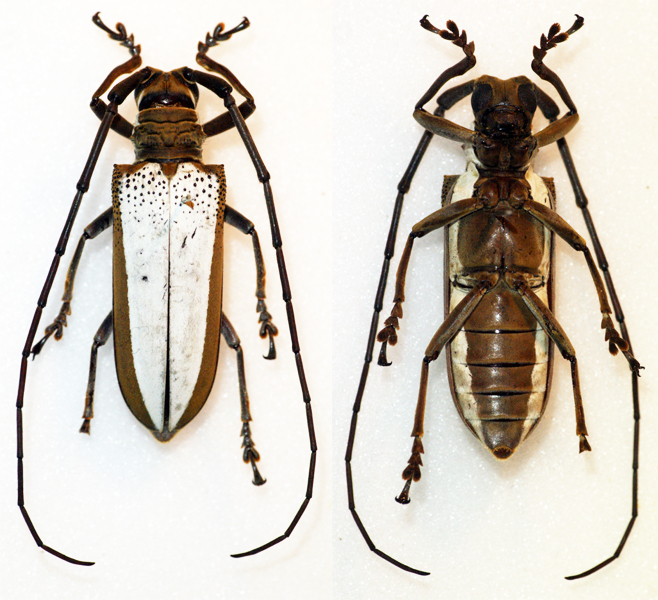

Scientific classification
- Kingdom: Animalia
- Phylum: Arthropoda
- Class: Insecta
- Order: Coleoptera
- Suborder: Polyphaga
- Infraorder: Cucujiformia
- Family: Cerambycidae
- Genus: Apriona
- Species: A. brunneomarginata

Binomial name
- Apriona brunneomarginata (Breuning, 1948)

Synonyms
- Parapriona brunneomarginata Breuning, 1948

= Apriona brunneomarginata =

Species of beetle

Apriona brunneomarginata is a species of beetle in the family Cerambycidae. It was described by Stephan von Breuning in 1948. It is known from Borneo.
