= Apriona novaeguineae =

Scientific classification
- Domain: Eukaryota
- Kingdom: Animalia
- Phylum: Arthropoda
- Class: Insecta
- Order: Coleoptera
- Suborder: Polyphaga
- Infraorder: Cucujiformia
- Family: Cerambycidae
- Genus: Apriona
- Species: A. novaeguineae

Binomial name
- Apriona novaeguineae Gilmour, 1958

Species of beetle

Apriona novaeguineae is a species of beetle in the family Cerambycidae. It was described by Gilmour in 1958. It is known from Papua New Guinea.
