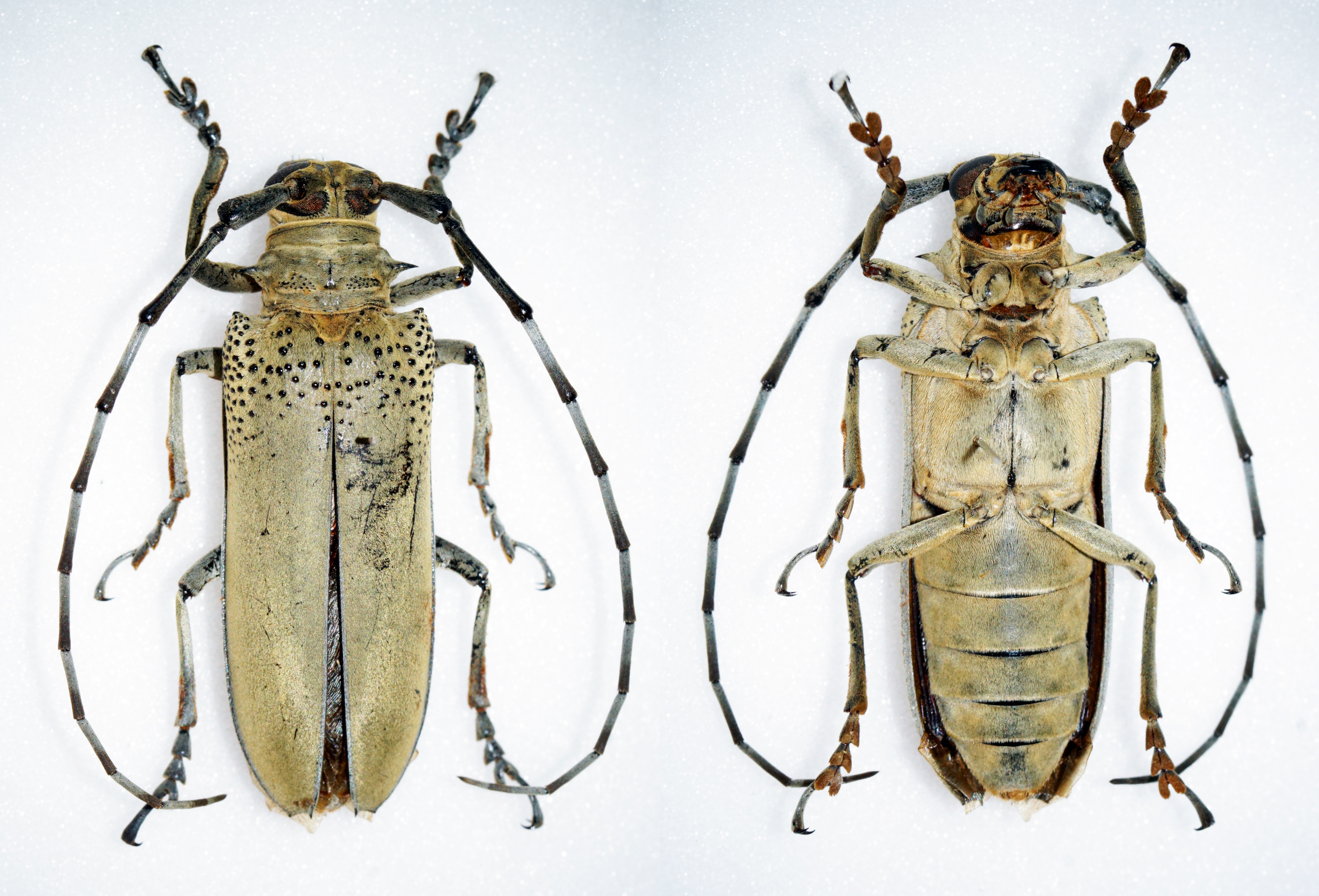

Scientific classification
- Domain: Eukaryota
- Kingdom: Animalia
- Phylum: Arthropoda
- Class: Insecta
- Order: Coleoptera
- Suborder: Polyphaga
- Infraorder: Cucujiformia
- Family: Cerambycidae
- Genus: Apriona
- Species: A. cinerea

Binomial name
- Apriona cinerea Chevrolat, 1852

= Apriona cinerea =

Species of beetle

Apriona cinerea, also known as the poplar stem borer or the apple stem borer, is a species of beetle in the family Cerambycidae. It was described by Louis Alexandre Auguste Chevrolat in 1852. It is known from India and Pakistan. It contains the varietas Apriona cinerea var. newcombei.

== Description ==
An adult beetle is 26-50mm in length and narrower in width at around 15-16mm. They are greyish-yellow, and their underside is black. The antenna are slightly longer than the body, in both males and females.

== Distribution and habitat ==
A. cinerea is native to the western ranges of the Himalayas and in the areas adjoining India and Pakistan.

In India, they are found in north-western states, including Jammu and Kashmir, Himachal Pradesh, Uttarakhand, Uttar Pradesh, Hariyana and Punjab.

As for Pakistan, A. cinerea can be found in the Sindh province, in the Peshawar and Parachinar cities of the Khyber Pakhtunkhwa Province (also known as the North-West Frontier Province), and Rawalpindi of the Punjab province.
