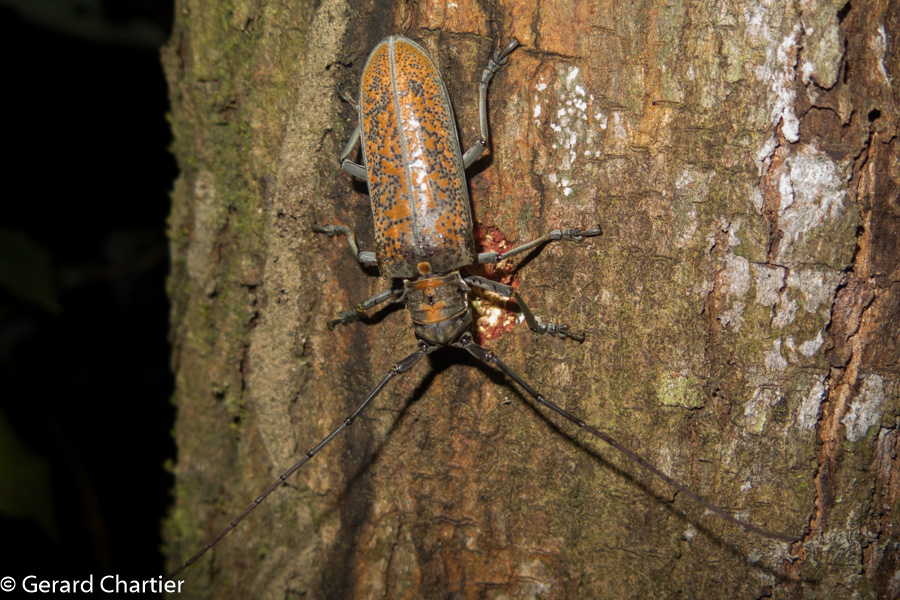

Scientific classification
- Kingdom: Animalia
- Phylum: Arthropoda
- Class: Insecta
- Order: Coleoptera
- Suborder: Polyphaga
- Infraorder: Cucujiformia
- Family: Cerambycidae
- Genus: Apriona
- Species: A. submaculosa

Binomial name
- Apriona submaculosa Pic, 1917

Synonyms
- Anapriona submaculosa (Pic) Breuning, 1949

= Apriona submaculosa =

Species of beetle

Apriona submaculosa is a species of beetle in the family Cerambycidae. It was described by Maurice Pic in 1917. It is known from Vietnam.
