= Apriona neglecta =

Scientific classification
- Kingdom: Animalia
- Phylum: Arthropoda
- Clade: Pancrustacea
- Class: Insecta
- Order: Coleoptera
- Suborder: Polyphaga
- Infraorder: Cucujiformia
- Family: Cerambycidae
- Genus: Apriona
- Species: A. neglecta

Binomial name
- Apriona neglecta Ritsema, 1911

Synonyms
- Apriona durga Kriesche, 1919

Species of beetle

Apriona neglecta is a species of beetle in the family Cerambycidae. It was described by Coenraad Ritsema in 1911. It is known from Sulawesi and Sumatra.
