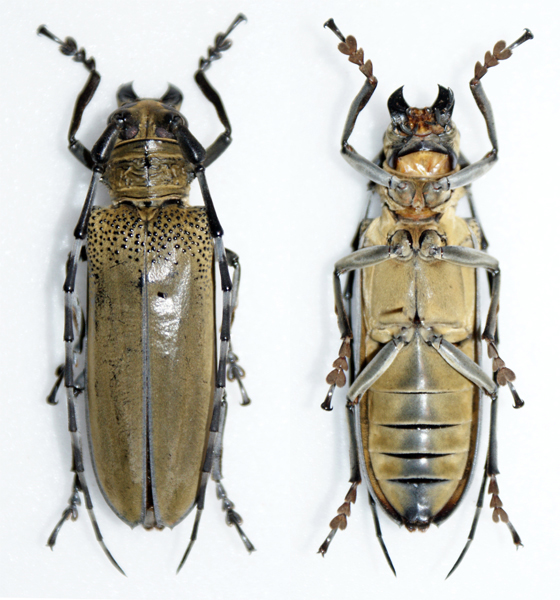

Scientific classification
- Kingdom: Animalia
- Phylum: Arthropoda
- Class: Insecta
- Order: Coleoptera
- Suborder: Polyphaga
- Infraorder: Cucujiformia
- Family: Cerambycidae
- Genus: Apriona
- Species: A. germari

Binomial name
- Apriona germari Hope, 1831

= Apriona germari =

Species of beetle

Apriona germari (also known as the mulberry longhorn beetle) is a species of beetle in the subfamily Lamiinae, found in India, through Southeast Asia, to southern China. It is mostly yellow in colour.
