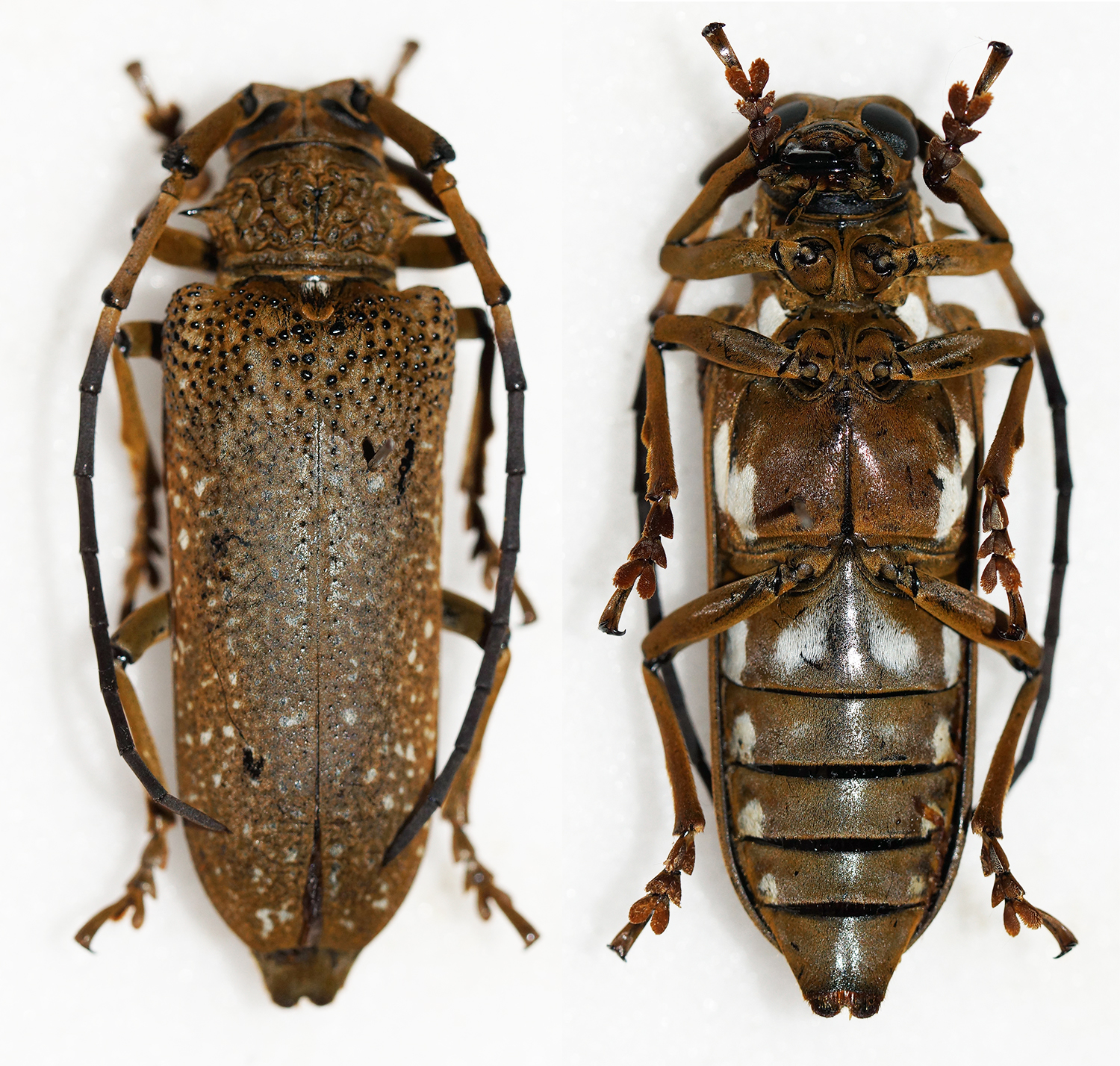

Scientific classification
- Domain: Eukaryota
- Kingdom: Animalia
- Phylum: Arthropoda
- Class: Insecta
- Order: Coleoptera
- Suborder: Polyphaga
- Infraorder: Cucujiformia
- Family: Cerambycidae
- Genus: Apriona
- Species: A. swainsoni

Binomial name
- Apriona swainsoni (Hope, 1840)

Synonyms
- Lamia swainsoni Hope, 1840

= Apriona swainsoni =

Species of beetle

Apriona swainsoni is a species of beetle in the family Cerambycidae. It was described by Hope in 1840. It is known from Myanmar, China, Laos, North Korea, South Korea, Vietnam, and Thailand. It feeds off of Caesalpinia decapetala.

== Subspecies ==
- Apriona swainsoni basicornis Fairmaire, 1895
- Apriona swainsoni subteruniformis Breuning, 1954
- Apriona swainsoni swainsoni Hope, 1840
