= Apriona multigranula =

Scientific classification
- Domain: Eukaryota
- Kingdom: Animalia
- Phylum: Arthropoda
- Class: Insecta
- Order: Coleoptera
- Suborder: Polyphaga
- Infraorder: Cucujiformia
- Family: Cerambycidae
- Genus: Apriona
- Species: A. multigranula

Binomial name
- Apriona multigranula Thomson, 1878

Species of beetle

Apriona multigranula is a species of beetle in the family Cerambycidae. It was described by Thomson in 1878. It is known from the Philippines.
