= Apriona elsa =

Scientific classification
- Kingdom: Animalia
- Phylum: Arthropoda
- Clade: Pancrustacea
- Class: Insecta
- Order: Coleoptera
- Suborder: Polyphaga
- Infraorder: Cucujiformia
- Family: Cerambycidae
- Genus: Apriona
- Species: A. elsa

Binomial name
- Apriona elsa Kriesche, 1919

Synonyms
- Apriona krieschei Gilmour, 1958; Apriona vivesi Breuning, 1981

Species of beetle

Apriona elsa is a species of beetle in the family Cerambycidae. It was described by Kriesche in 1919. It is known from Malaysia, Java and Sumatra.
