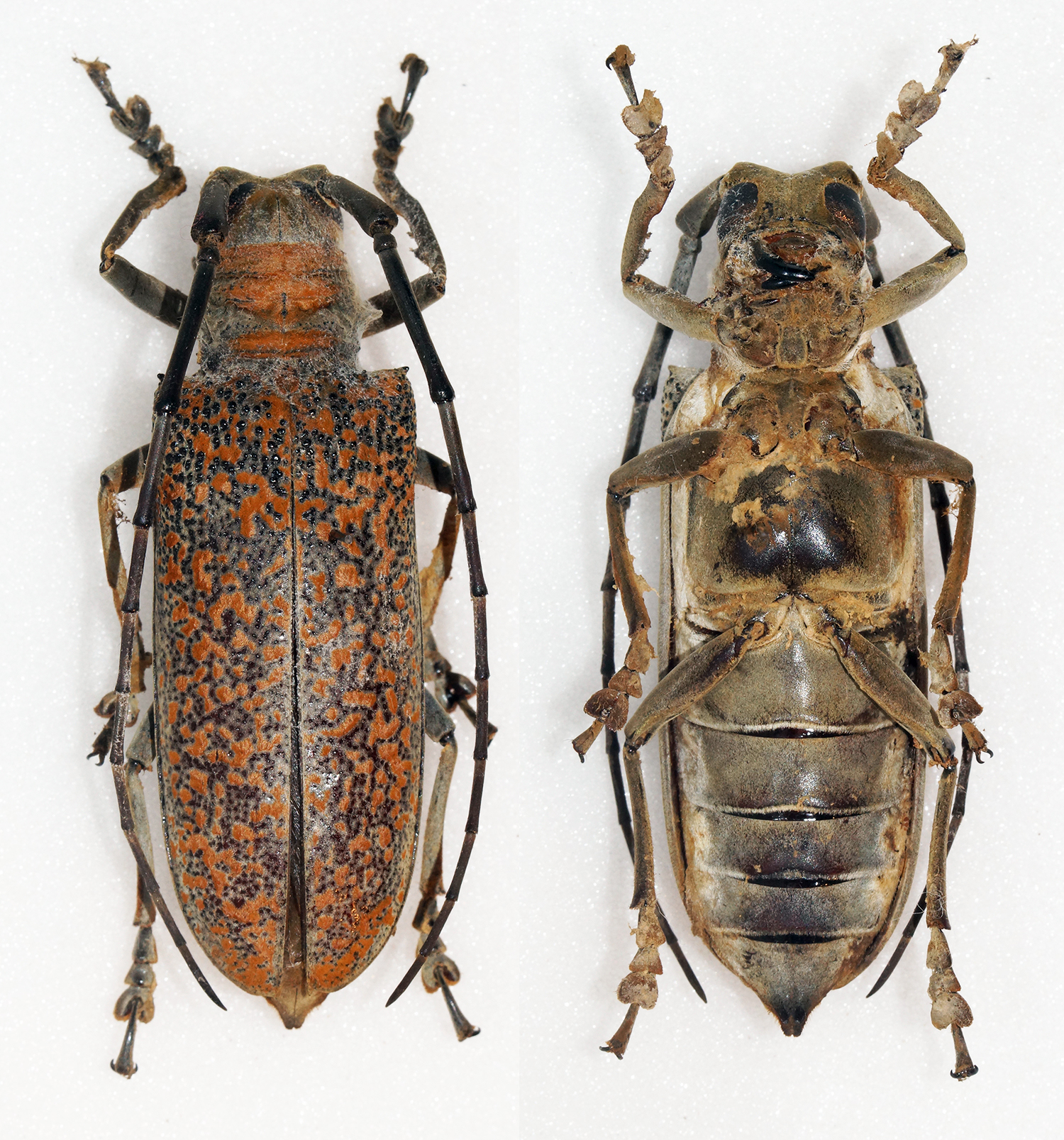

Scientific classification
- Kingdom: Animalia
- Phylum: Arthropoda
- Clade: Pancrustacea
- Class: Insecta
- Order: Coleoptera
- Suborder: Polyphaga
- Infraorder: Cucujiformia
- Family: Cerambycidae
- Genus: Apriona
- Species: A. marcusiana

Binomial name
- Apriona marcusiana Kriesche, 1919

= Apriona marcusiana =

Species of beetle

Apriona marcusiana is a species of beetle belonging to the Cerambycidae family. It was described by Kriesche in 1919. It is known from Malaysia, Borneo and Sumatra.
