= Apriona neglectissima =

Scientific classification
- Kingdom: Animalia
- Phylum: Arthropoda
- Class: Insecta
- Order: Coleoptera
- Suborder: Polyphaga
- Infraorder: Cucujiformia
- Family: Cerambycidae
- Genus: Apriona
- Species: A. neglectissima

Binomial name
- Apriona neglectissima de Jong, 1936

Species of beetle

Apriona neglectissima is a species of beetle in the family Cerambycidae. It was described by de Jong in 1936. It is known from Borneo.
