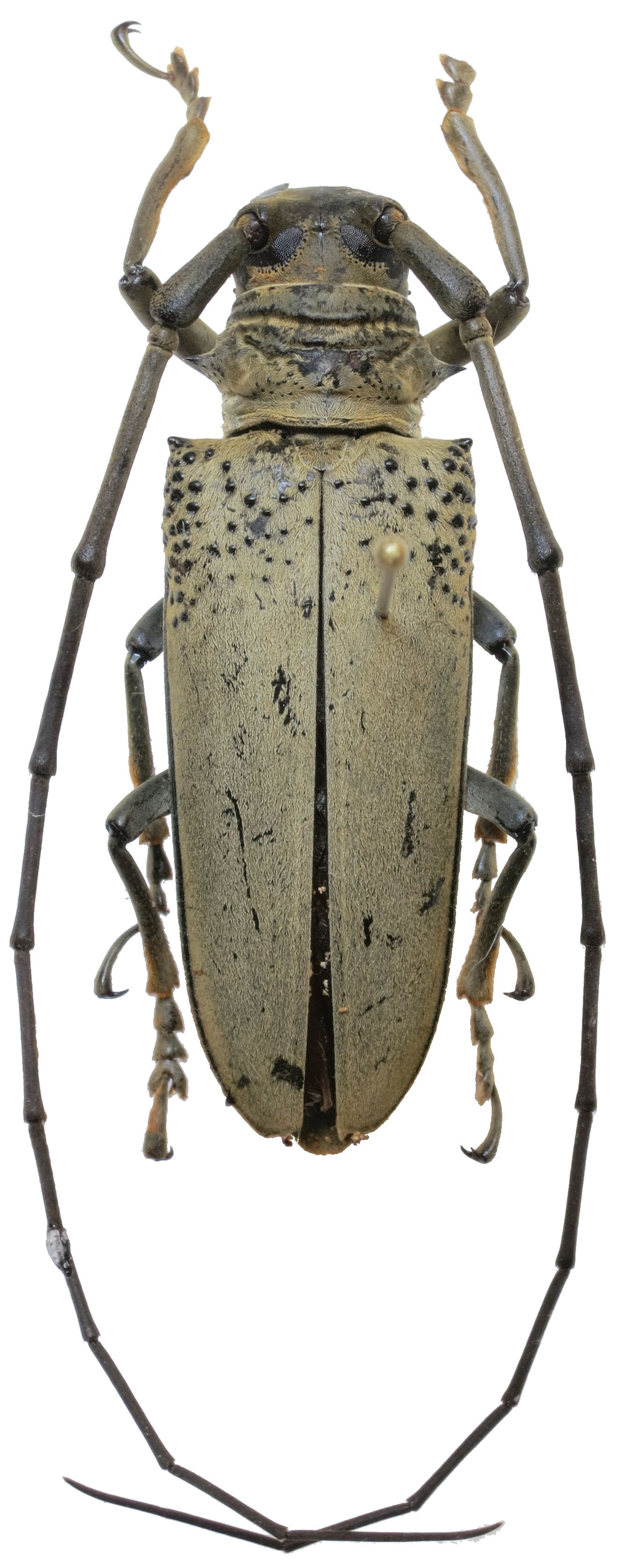
- Apriona rixator male from Philippines

Scientific classification
- Kingdom: Animalia
- Phylum: Arthropoda
- Class: Insecta
- Order: Coleoptera
- Suborder: Polyphaga
- Infraorder: Cucujiformia
- Family: Cerambycidae
- Genus: Apriona
- Species: A. rixator

Binomial name
- Apriona rixator (Newman, 1842)

Synonyms
- Apriona borneensis Aurivillius, 1920; Batocera rixator Newman, 1842

= Apriona rixator =

Species of beetle

Apriona rixator is a species of beetle in the family Cerambycidae. It is known from Malaysia, Borneo, and the Philippines.
