= Apriona irma =

Scientific classification
- Kingdom: Animalia
- Phylum: Arthropoda
- Class: Insecta
- Order: Coleoptera
- Suborder: Polyphaga
- Infraorder: Cucujiformia
- Family: Cerambycidae
- Genus: Apriona
- Species: A. irma

Binomial name
- Apriona irma Kriesche, 1919

Species of beetle

Apriona irma is a species of beetle in the family Cerambycidae. It was described by Kriesche in 1919.
