= Apriona tuberosicollis =

Scientific classification
- Domain: Eukaryota
- Kingdom: Animalia
- Phylum: Arthropoda
- Class: Insecta
- Order: Coleoptera
- Suborder: Polyphaga
- Infraorder: Cucujiformia
- Family: Cerambycidae
- Genus: Apriona
- Species: A. tuberosicollis

Binomial name
- Apriona tuberosicollis Fuchs, 1961

Species of beetle

Apriona tuberosicollis is a species of beetle in the family Cerambycidae.
