= Apriona chemsaki =

Scientific classification
- Domain: Eukaryota
- Kingdom: Animalia
- Phylum: Arthropoda
- Class: Insecta
- Order: Coleoptera
- Suborder: Polyphaga
- Infraorder: Cucujiformia
- Family: Cerambycidae
- Genus: Apriona
- Species: A. chemsaki

Binomial name
- Apriona chemsaki Hua, 1986

Species of beetle

Apriona chemsaki is a species of beetle in the family Cerambycidae. It was described by Hua in 1986. It is known from China.
