= Apriona ammiralis =

Scientific classification
- Kingdom: Animalia
- Phylum: Arthropoda
- Class: Insecta
- Order: Coleoptera
- Suborder: Polyphaga
- Infraorder: Cucujiformia
- Family: Cerambycidae
- Genus: Apriona
- Species: A. ammiralis

Binomial name
- Apriona ammiralis Breuning, 1935

Synonyms
- Apriona novaebritaniae Gilmour, 1958

Species of beetle

Apriona ammiralis is a species of beetle in the family Cerambycidae. It was described by Stephan von Breuning in 1935. It is known from Papua New Guinea.
