= Apriona tigris =

Scientific classification
- Domain: Eukaryota
- Kingdom: Animalia
- Phylum: Arthropoda
- Class: Insecta
- Order: Coleoptera
- Suborder: Polyphaga
- Infraorder: Cucujiformia
- Family: Cerambycidae
- Genus: Apriona
- Species: A. tigris

Binomial name
- Apriona tigris Thomson, 1878

Species of beetle

Apriona tigris is a species of beetle in the family Cerambycidae. It was described by Thomson in 1878.
