= Apriona buruensis =

Scientific classification
- Kingdom: Animalia
- Phylum: Arthropoda
- Class: Insecta
- Order: Coleoptera
- Suborder: Polyphaga
- Infraorder: Cucujiformia
- Family: Cerambycidae
- Genus: Apriona
- Species: A. buruensis

Binomial name
- Apriona buruensis Ritsema, 1898

Species of beetle

Apriona buruensis is a species of beetle in the family Cerambycidae. It was described by Coenraad Ritsema in 1898. It is known from the Moluccas and Papua New Guinea.
