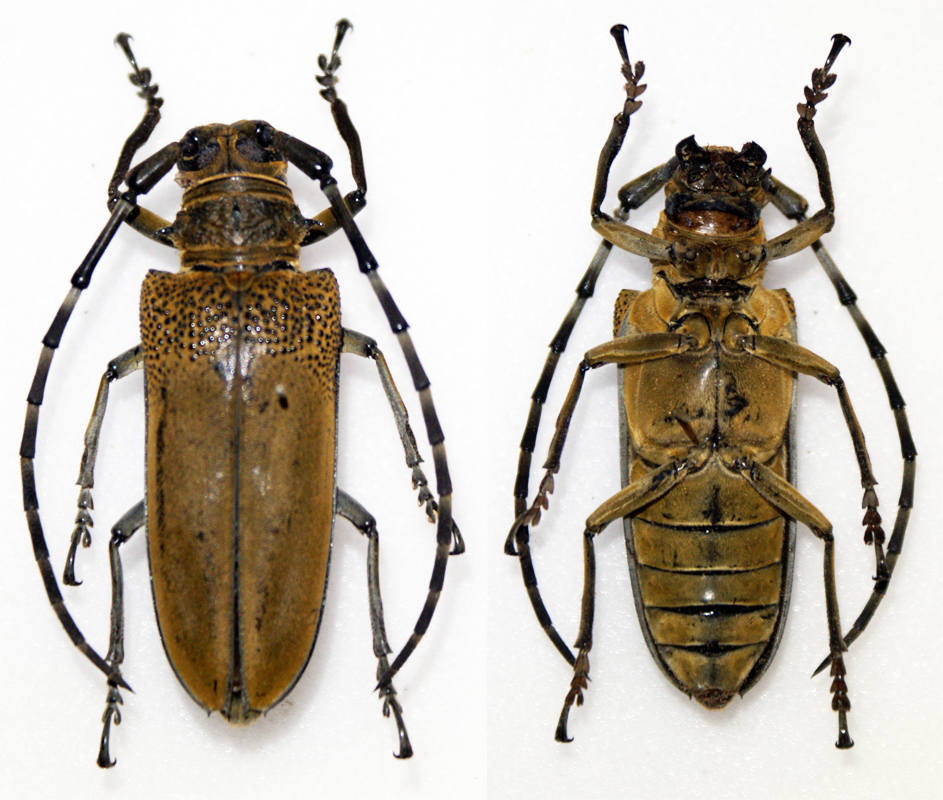

Scientific classification
- Domain: Eukaryota
- Kingdom: Animalia
- Phylum: Arthropoda
- Class: Insecta
- Order: Coleoptera
- Suborder: Polyphaga
- Infraorder: Cucujiformia
- Family: Cerambycidae
- Genus: Apriona
- Species: A. flavescens

Binomial name
- Apriona flavescens Kaup, 1866

Synonyms
- Apriona malaccana Thomson 1878; Apriona rheinwartii Thomson 1878; Apriona fasciata Ritsema 1898; Apriona flavescens niasensis Gilmour 1958; Apriona flavescens lomblenensis Breuning 1982

= Apriona flavescens =

Species of beetle

Apriona flavescens is a species of beetle in the family Cerambycidae.
