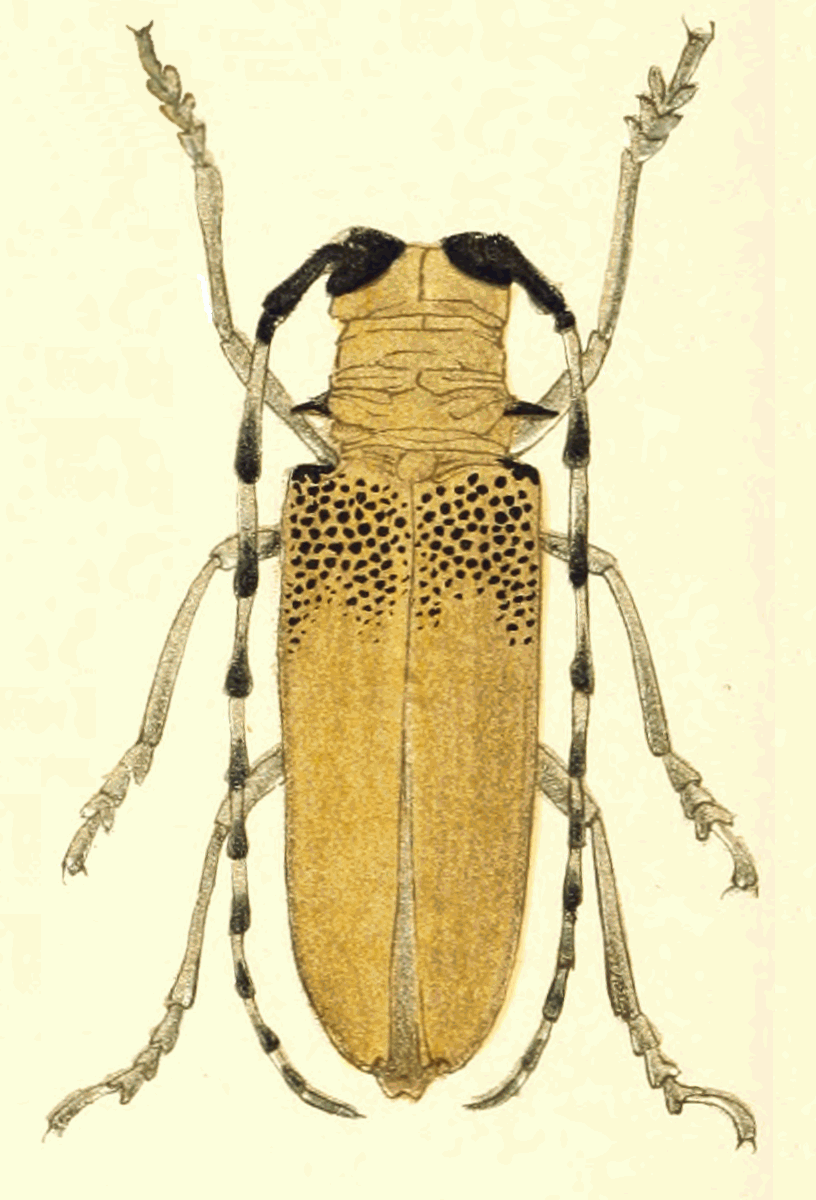

Scientific classification
- Domain: Eukaryota
- Kingdom: Animalia
- Phylum: Arthropoda
- Class: Insecta
- Order: Coleoptera
- Suborder: Polyphaga
- Infraorder: Cucujiformia
- Family: Cerambycidae
- Genus: Apriona
- Species: A. rugicollis

Binomial name
- Apriona rugicollis Chevrolat, 1852

Synonyms
- Apriona gressitti Gilmour, 1958; Apriona japonica Thomson, 1878; Apriona plicicollis Motschulsky, 1853

= Apriona rugicollis =

Species of beetle

Apriona rugicollis is a species of beetle in the family Cerambycidae. It was described by Louis Alexandre Auguste Chevrolat in 1852. It is known from China, Cambodia, Japan, Taiwan, North Korea, South Korea, and Vietnam.

== Subspecies ==
- Apriona rugicollis nobuoi Breuning & Ohbayashi, 1966
- Apriona rugicollis rugicollis Chevrolat, 1852
- Apriona rugicollis yayeyamai Breuning, 1976
