= Apriona trilineata =

Scientific classification
- Domain: Eukaryota
- Kingdom: Animalia
- Phylum: Arthropoda
- Class: Insecta
- Order: Coleoptera
- Suborder: Polyphaga
- Infraorder: Cucujiformia
- Family: Cerambycidae
- Genus: Apriona
- Species: A. trilineata

Binomial name
- Apriona trilineata Chevrolat, 1852

Species of beetle

Apriona trilineata is a species of beetle in the family Cerambycidae. It was described by Louis Alexandre Auguste Chevrolat in 1852. It is known from India and Bangladesh.
