= Apriona punctatissima =

Scientific classification
- Kingdom: Animalia
- Phylum: Arthropoda
- Clade: Pancrustacea
- Class: Insecta
- Order: Coleoptera
- Suborder: Polyphaga
- Infraorder: Cucujiformia
- Family: Cerambycidae
- Genus: Apriona
- Species: A. punctatissima

Binomial name
- Apriona punctatissima Kaup, 1866

Synonyms
- Apriona grisescens Breuning, 1947

Species of beetle

Apriona punctatissima is a species of beetle in the family Cerambycidae. It was described by Kaup in 1866. It is known from Sulawesi.
