= Atimura fulva =

Scientific classification
- Domain: Eukaryota
- Kingdom: Animalia
- Phylum: Arthropoda
- Class: Insecta
- Order: Coleoptera
- Suborder: Polyphaga
- Infraorder: Cucujiformia
- Family: Cerambycidae
- Genus: Atimura
- Species: A. fulva

Binomial name
- Atimura fulva Schwarzer, 1925

Species of beetle

Atimura fulva is a species of beetle in the family Cerambycidae. It was described by Schwarzer in 1925.
