= Apriona unidentata =

Scientific classification
- Kingdom: Animalia
- Phylum: Arthropoda
- Class: Insecta
- Order: Coleoptera
- Suborder: Polyphaga
- Infraorder: Cucujiformia
- Family: Cerambycidae
- Genus: Apriona
- Species: A. unidentata

Binomial name
- Apriona unidentata Pic, 1936

Synonyms
- Anapriona unidentata (Pic) Breuning, 1949

Species of beetle

Apriona unidentata is a species of beetle in the family Cerambycidae. It was described by Maurice Pic in 1936. It is known from Vietnam.
