= Acacia cylindrica =

Conservation status
- Priority Three — Poorly Known Taxa (DEC)

Scientific classification
- Kingdom: Plantae
- Clade: Tracheophytes
- Clade: Angiosperms
- Clade: Eudicots
- Clade: Rosids
- Order: Fabales
- Family: Fabaceae
- Subfamily: Caesalpinioideae
- Clade: Mimosoid clade
- Genus: Acacia
- Species: A. cylindrica

Binomial name
- Acacia cylindrica R.S.Cowan & Maslin
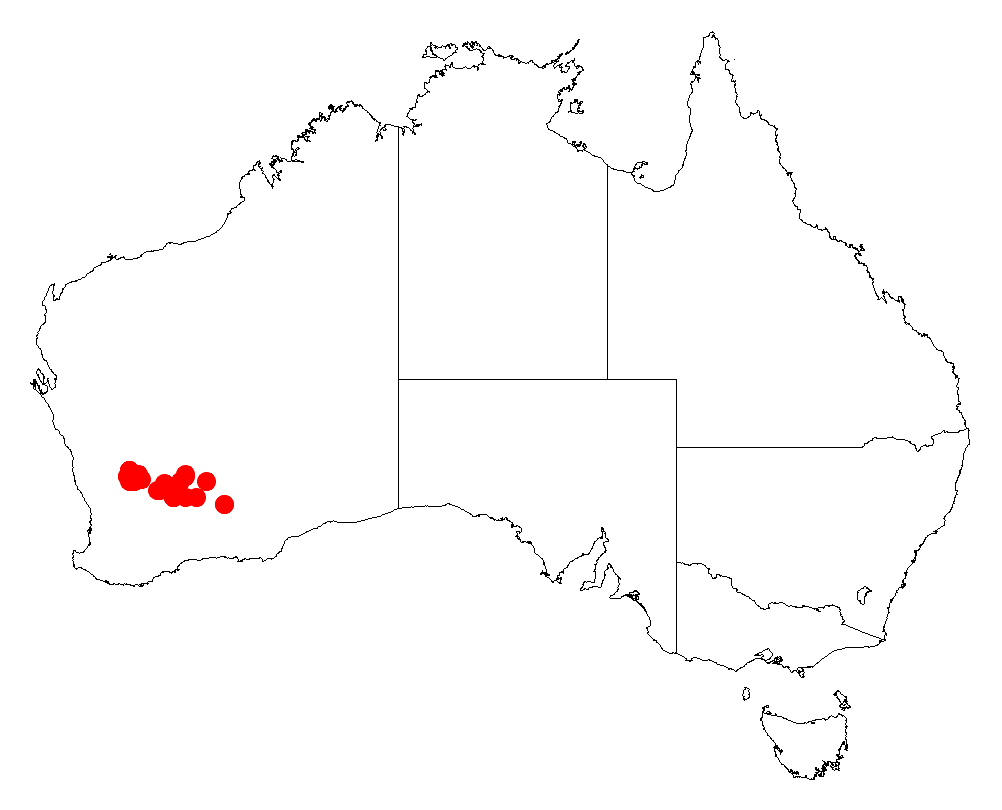
- Occurrence data from AVH

Synonyms
- Racosperma cylindricum (R.S.Cowan & Maslin) Pedley

Species of legume

Acacia cylindrica is a species of flowering plant in the family Fabaceae and is endemic to Western Australia. It is a spreading shrub with terete to four-angled phyllodes with a sharp point on the end, spikes of golden yellow flowers and linear, papery pods.

== Description ==
Acacia cylindrica is spreading shrub that typically grows to a height of 1.5–3 m (4 ft 11 in – 9 ft 10 in) and has branchlets that are covered with silky hairs between glabrous, resinous ribs. Its phyllodes are straight and round to four-sided in cross section, 80–130 mm (3.1–5.1 in) long and 1.0–1.2 mm (0.039–0.047 in) in diameter with 16 closely parallel veins, although sometimes only 8 are readily visible. The flowers are borne in one or two spikes 10–11 mm (0.39–0.43 in) long and about 5 mm (0.20 in) wide on a peduncle 0.15–1.5 mm (0.0059–0.0591 in) long in axils, the spikes densely crowded with golden yellow flowers. Flowering has been recorded in September and October, and the pods are linear, flat and papery, up to 6.5 mm (0.26 in) long and 2.0–2.5 mm (0.079–0.098 in) wide. The seeds are oblong, more or less shiny, pale brown, 3.5–4.0 mm (0.14–0.16 in) long.

== Taxonomy ==
Acacia cylindrica was first formally described in 1995 by the botanists Bruce Maslin and Richard Sumner Cowan in the journal Nuytsia from specimens collected in 1984, 23 km (14 mi) north-east of Bungalbin Hill, about 68 km (42 mi) north-north-east of Koolyanobbing by Kenneth Newbey. The specific epithet (cylindrica) means 'cylindrical', alluding to the shape of the flower spikes, that distinguish this species from others in the Acacia heteroneura group.

== Distribution ==
This species of wattle grows on flats and undulating plains and low hills in gravelly, sandy soils in open shrubland. It mainly occurs between Southern Cross and Bullfinch with other, smaller populations found further to the north, in the Avon Wheatbelt and Coolgardie bioregions of Western Australia.

== Conservation status ==
Acacia cylindrica is listed as "Priority Three" by the Government of Western Australia, Department of Biodiversity, Conservation and Attractions, meaning that it is poorly known and known from only a few locations but is not under imminent threat.

== See also ==
- List of Acacia species
