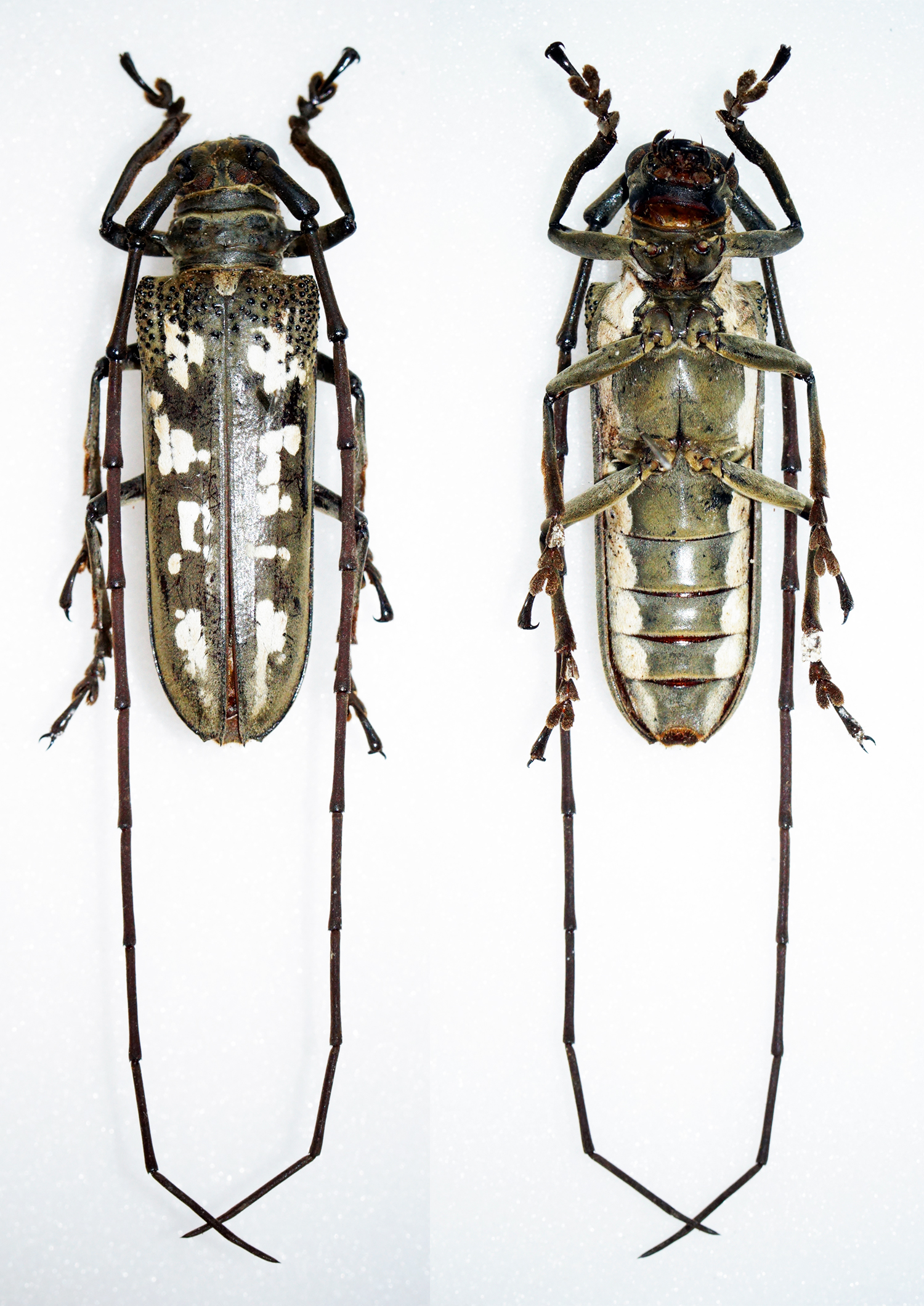

Scientific classification
- Kingdom: Animalia
- Phylum: Arthropoda
- Clade: Pancrustacea
- Class: Insecta
- Order: Coleoptera
- Suborder: Polyphaga
- Infraorder: Cucujiformia
- Family: Cerambycidae
- Genus: Apriona
- Species: A. cylindrica

Binomial name
- Apriona cylindrica (Thomson, 1857)

Synonyms
- Apriona gracilicornis Thomson, 1878; Apriona lethuauti Schmitt & Le Tuauth, 2000; Monochamus cylindricus Thomson, 1857

= Apriona cylindrica =

Species of beetle

Apriona cylindrica is a species of beetle in the family Cerambycidae. It was described by Thomson in 1857. It is known from Java.
