= Amastra cylindrica =

- Live Amastra cylindrica intermedia in situ, Oahu, Hawaii.

Conservation status
- Critically Endangered (IUCN 2.3)

- Critically Imperiled (NatureServe)

Scientific classification
- Kingdom: Animalia
- Phylum: Mollusca
- Class: Gastropoda
- Order: Stylommatophora
- Family: Amastridae
- Genus: Amastra
- Species: A. cylindrica

Binomial name
- Amastra cylindrica (Newcomb, 1854)

Synonyms
- Achatinella (Laminella) grossa L. Pfeiffer, 1856 junior subjective synonym; Achatinella cylindrica Newcomb, 1854 superseded combination; Achatinella intermedia Newcomb, 1854 junior subjective synonym; Achatinella porphyrea Newcomb, 1854 junior subjective synonym; Amastra (Paramastra) cylindrica (Newcomb, 1854) · alternative representation; Amastra conicospira E. A. Smith, 1873 junior subjective synonym

Species of gastropod

Amastra cylindrica is a species of land snail, a terrestrial pulmonate gastropod mollusc in the family Amastridae.

== Description ==
(Original description) The shell is dextral, elongately cylindrical, tapering to a pointed summit. It consists of seven slightly rounded whorls separated by a moderately distinct suture. The aperture is oblong-ovate, and the columella ends in a flexuous tooth. The shell's surface is marked by strong longitudinal striations. Its coloration is of a light horn tone, encircled by numerous narrow brown bands.

== Distribution ==
This species is endemic to Oahu Island, Hawaii.

== Conservation status ==
This species is one of the rarest mollusks in the world. While the captive population grew well, the wild population gradually dwindled down to one wild individual. The species is now only present in captive breeding and in small patches of protected habitat in the Waianae Mountains.
