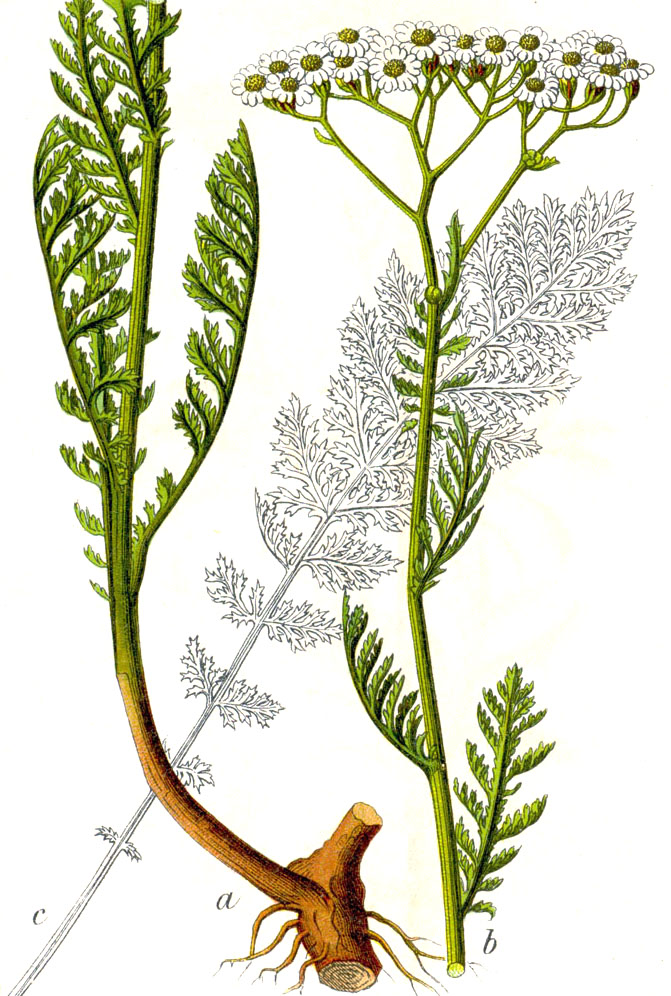

Scientific classification
- Kingdom: Plantae
- Clade: Embryophytes
- Clade: Tracheophytes
- Clade: Angiosperms
- Clade: Eudicots
- Clade: Asterids
- Order: Asterales
- Family: Asteraceae
- Genus: Achillea
- Species: A. nobilis

Binomial name
- Achillea nobilis L.

Synonyms
- Synonymy: Achillea camphorata Gilib.; Achillea corymbifera S.G.Gmel.; Achillea cylindrica Poir.; Achillea decipiens Vest; Achillea eridania Bertol.; Achillea fruticulosa Willd. ex Ledeb.; Achillea gerberi M.Bieb. 1808 not Willd. 1803; Achillea grata Fenzl ex Tchich.; Achillea hispanica Schrank; Achillea ligustica Vis. ex Nyman 1879, illegitimate homonym not All. 1773; Achillea ochroleuca Waldst. & Kit.; Achillea odorata Pall. 1793 not L. 1753; Achillea paucidentata (Ambrosi) Dalla Torre & Sarnth.; Achillea pectinata Lam.; Achillea pubescens Willd.; Achillea punctata Ten. ex Tchich.; Achillea schkuhrii Spreng. ex Nyman; Chamaemelum achilleum E.H.L.Krause; Chamaemelum gerberi (Willd.) E.H.L.Krause

= Achillea nobilis =

Noble yarrow

Species of yarrow

Achillea nobilis, the noble yarrow, is a Eurasian flowering plant in the sunflower family.

== Description ==
The medium green foliage forms a low-growing clump in early spring and in late spring produces flowering stems that grow up to 75 cm (30 in) tall; the stems end in flat flower clusters (umbels). The foliage and stems are covered with soft hairs.

The flowers are creamy-whitish or yellow.

=== Similar species ===
It resembles Achillea millefolium (common yarrow), which has much more finely dissected leaves and fewer, larger flowers.

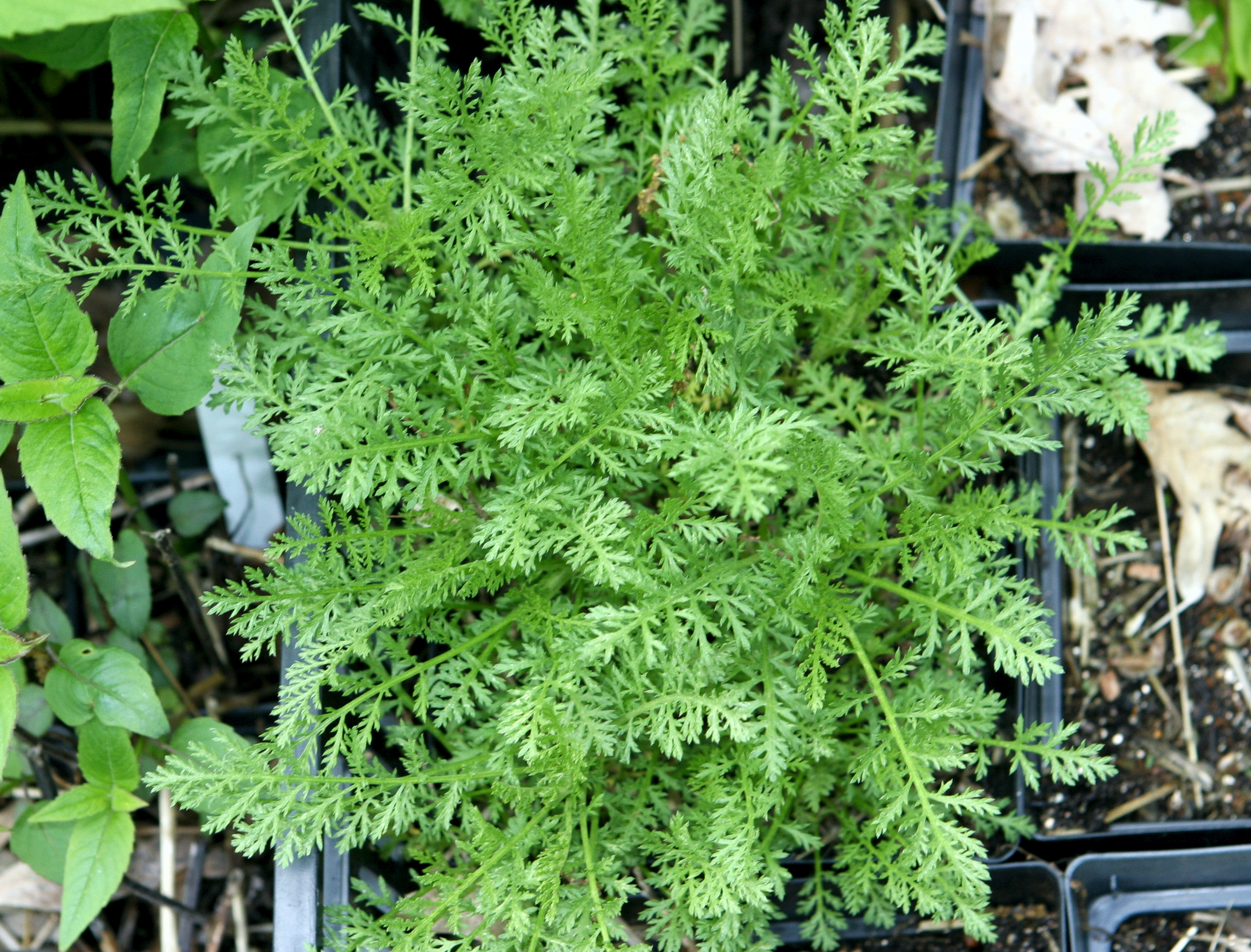
Foliage

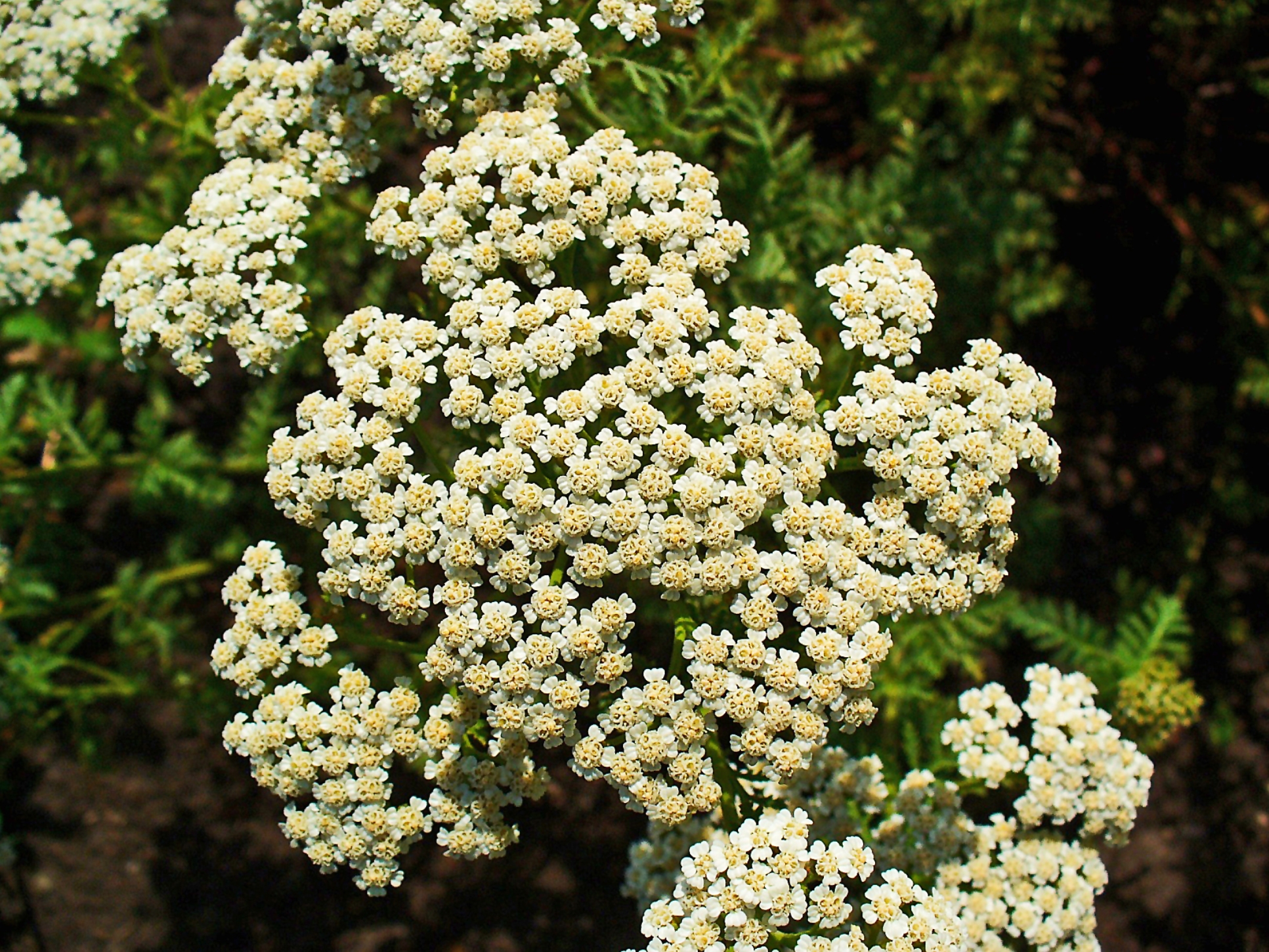
Inflorescence

== Distribution and habitat ==
It is native to Eurasia, widespread across most of Europe (except Scandinavia and the British Isles) and also present in Turkey, the Caucasus, and Central Asia. It is reportedly present in Xinjiang Province in western China, but this is based on a single herbarium specimen collected in the 19th century. The species is widely cultivated and has become naturalized outside of its range in North America and other parts of the world.
