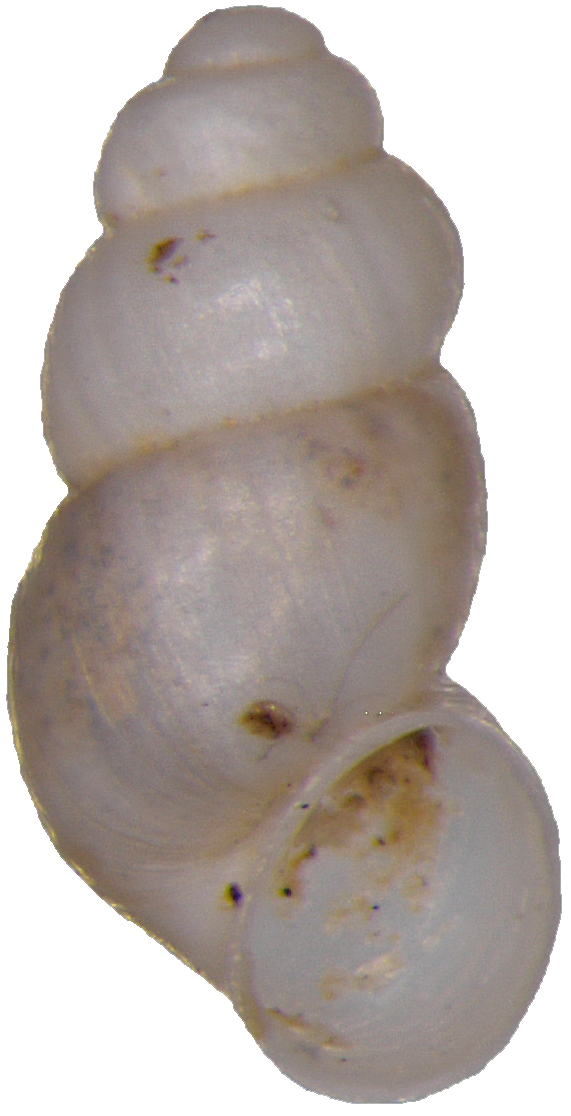
- Apertural view of a shell of Alzoniella slovenica

Scientific classification
- Kingdom: Animalia
- Phylum: Mollusca
- Class: Gastropoda
- Subclass: Caenogastropoda
- Order: Littorinimorpha
- Superfamily: Truncatelloidea
- Family: Hydrobiidae
- Subfamily: Islamiinae
- Genus: Alzoniella; Giusti & Bodon, 1984

Type species
- Alzoniella finalina Fo. Giusti & Bodon, 1984 (type by original designation)
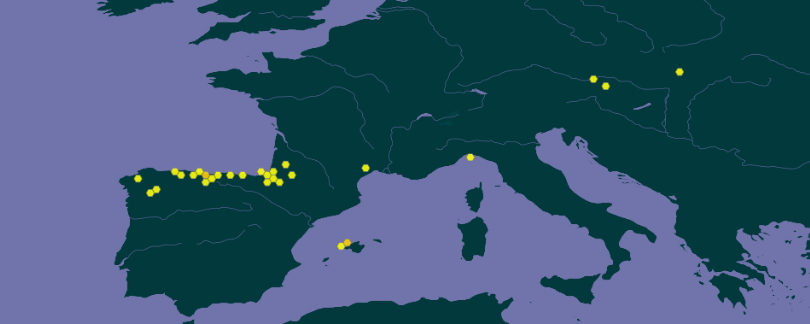

Synonyms
- Alzoniella (Alzoniella) Fo. Giusti & Bodon, 1984 alternative representation

= Alzoniella =

Genus of gastropods

Alzoniella is a genus of minute freshwater spring snails, aquatic gastropod mollusks or micromollusks in the subfamily Islamiinae of the family Hydrobiidae.

== Description ==
All the species within the snail genus Alzoniella are crenobiotic, i.e. they are dependent on springs as a habitat. Some are stygobiont, i.e. living exclusively in underground rivers. They are tiny to minute, usually with delicate, elongated, white or translucent shells. The conical to cylindrical-conical shells often have smooth or finely striated surfaces, and the three to four whorls are quite convex (except the body whorl) with deep sutures.

== Distribution ==
Alzoniella is primarily found in Europe (mainly in Spain), often in very localized, isolated habitats, with some species restricted to underground freshwater habitats such as specific springs or cave systems.

== Species ==
The genus Alzoniella contains the following species:

- Alzoniella asturica (Boeters & Rolán, 1988)
- Alzoniella bergomensis Pezzoli, 2010
- Alzoniella borberensis Bodon & Cianfanelli, 2022
- Alzoniella braccoensis Bodon & Cianfanelli, 2004
- Alzoniella calorensis Cianfanelli & Bodon, 2017
- Alzoniella camocaensis Rolán & Boeters, 2015
- Alzoniella cantabrica (Boeters, 1983)
- Alzoniella cervarensis Cianfanelli, Talenti, Nardi & Bodon, 2019
- Alzoniella cornucopia (De Stefani, 1880)
- Alzoniella delmastroi Bodon & Cianfanelli, 2004
- Alzoniella edmulndi (Boeters, 1984)
- Alzoniella fabrianensis (Pezzoli, 1969)
- Alzoniella feneriensis Fo. Giusti & Bodon, 1984
- Alzoniella finalina Giusti & Bodon, 1984
- Alzoniella galaica (Boeters & Rolán, 1988)
- Alzoniella haicabia Boeters, 2000
- Alzoniella hartwigschuetti (Reischütz, 1983)
- Alzoniella iberopyrenaica Arconada, Rolán & Boeters, 2007
- Alzoniella isoensis Bodon & Cianfanelli, 2022
- Alzoniella junqua Boeters, 2000
- Alzoniella katagabriellae Varga, 2021
- Alzoniella ligustica (Fo. Giusti & Bodon, 1981)
- Alzoniella lucensis (Rolán, 1993)
- Alzoniella lunensis Bodon & Cianfanelli, 2002
- Alzoniella macrostoma Bodon & Cianfanelli, 2002
- Alzoniella manganellii Bodon, Cianfanelli & Talenti, 1997
- Alzoniella marianae Arconada, Rolán & Boeters, 2007
- Alzoniella microstoma Bodon & Cianfanelli, 2002
- Alzoniella montana (Rolán, 1993)
- Alzoniella murita Boeters, 2003
- Alzoniella navarrensis Boeters, 1999
- onatensis Boeters, 2003
- Alzoniella ovetensis (Rolán, 1993)
- Alzoniella parvula (Fo. Giusti & Bodon, 1981)
- Alzoniella perrisii (Dupuy, 1851)
- Alzoniella pyrenaica Boeters, 1983
- Alzoniella rolani (Boeters, 1986)
- Alzoniella sigestra Fo. Giusti & Bodon, 1984
- Alzoniella slovenica (Ložek & Brtek, 1964)
- Alzoniella somiedoensis Rolán, Arconada & Boeters, 2009
- Alzoniella tanagrensis Cianfanelli & Bodon, 2017

Synonyms

- Alzoniella (Navarriella) Boeters, 2000 : synonym of Navarriella Boeters, 2000 (superseded combination)
- Alzoniella elliptica (Paladilhe, 1874) : synonym of Navarriella elliptica (Paladilhe, 1874) (superseded combination)
- Alzoniella pellitica Arconada, Rolán & Boeters, 2007: synonym of Navarriella elliptica (Paladilhe, 1874) (junior subjective synonym)
