= Alzoniella cornucopia =

Conservation status
- Vulnerable (IUCN 3.1)

Scientific classification
- Kingdom: Animalia
- Phylum: Mollusca
- Class: Gastropoda
- Subclass: Caenogastropoda
- Order: Littorinimorpha
- Family: Hydrobiidae
- Genus: Alzoniella
- Species: A. cornucopia

Binomial name
- Alzoniella cornucopia (De Stefani, 1880)

Synonyms
- Alzoniella (Alzoniella) cornucopia (De Stefani, 1880) alternative representation; Lartetia cornucopia De Stefani, 1880 (basionym); Paludinella (Lartetia) cornucopia (De Stefani, 1880) (unaccepted combination)

Species of gastropod

Alzoniella cornucopia is a species of very small aquatic snail, a spring snail, an operculate gastropod mollusc in the family Hydrobiidae.

== Description ==
The length of the shell attains 1.4 mm.

== Distribution ==
This species occurs off Siena, Italy.
