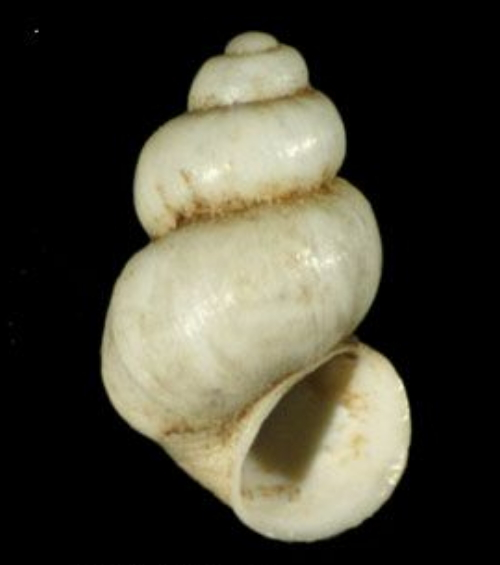
- Shell of Alzoniella junqua (specimen at the Natural History Museum, Rotterdam)

Conservation status
- Vulnerable (IUCN 3.1)

Scientific classification
- Kingdom: Animalia
- Phylum: Mollusca
- Class: Gastropoda
- Subclass: Caenogastropoda
- Order: Littorinimorpha
- Family: Hydrobiidae
- Genus: Alzoniella
- Species: A. junqua

Binomial name
- Alzoniella junqua Boeters, 2000

= Alzoniella junqua =

Species of gastropod

Alzoniella junqua is a species of very small aquatic snail, a spring snail, an operculate gastropod mollusc in the family Hydrobiidae.

== Description ==
The length of the shell varies between 1.4 mm and 1.8 mm, the diameter between 0.82 mm and 1 mm. The shell is white.

== Distribution ==
This species occurs in the Pyrénées-Atlantiques and Hérault, France.
