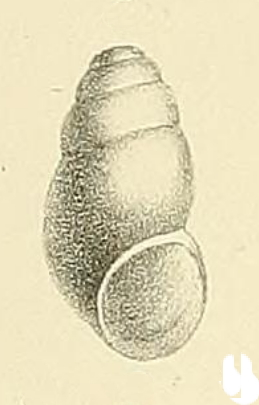
- Shell of Alzoniella perrisii (holotype)

Conservation status
- Vulnerable (IUCN 3.1)

Scientific classification
- Kingdom: Animalia
- Phylum: Mollusca
- Class: Gastropoda
- Subclass: Caenogastropoda
- Order: Littorinimorpha
- Family: Hydrobiidae
- Genus: Alzoniella
- Species: A. perrisii

Binomial name
- Alzoniella perrisii (Dupuy, 1851)

Synonyms
- Alzoniella (Alzoniella) perrisii (Dupuy, 1851); Hydrobia perrisii Dupuy, 1851 (original combination)

= Alzoniella perrisii =

Species of gastropod

Alzoniella perrisii is a species of very small aquatic snail, a spring snail, an operculate gastropod mollusc in the family Hydrobiidae.

Subspecies

- Alzoniella perrisii irubensis Boeters, 2000
- Alzoniella perrisii perrisii (Dupuy, 1851)

== Description ==
(Original description in Latin) The very small shell is imperforate, with a blunt protoconch and a slightly elongated cylindrical shape, remarkably smooth. The aperture is somewhat ovate-pyriform, with a slightly obtuse angle at the top, and features a continuous, straight, simple, and sharp peristome. The shell contains 4 whorls, gradually increasing in size, slightly convex, and separated by a faintly visible suture. The body whorl accounts for at least half of the shell's total length.

The shell is thin, horn-colored, translucent, and glossy, though often obscured by a dark coating of mud.

The operculum is very thin, translucent, and horn-yellow, and is slightly recessed into the body whorl.

== Distribution ==
This species occurs in France.
