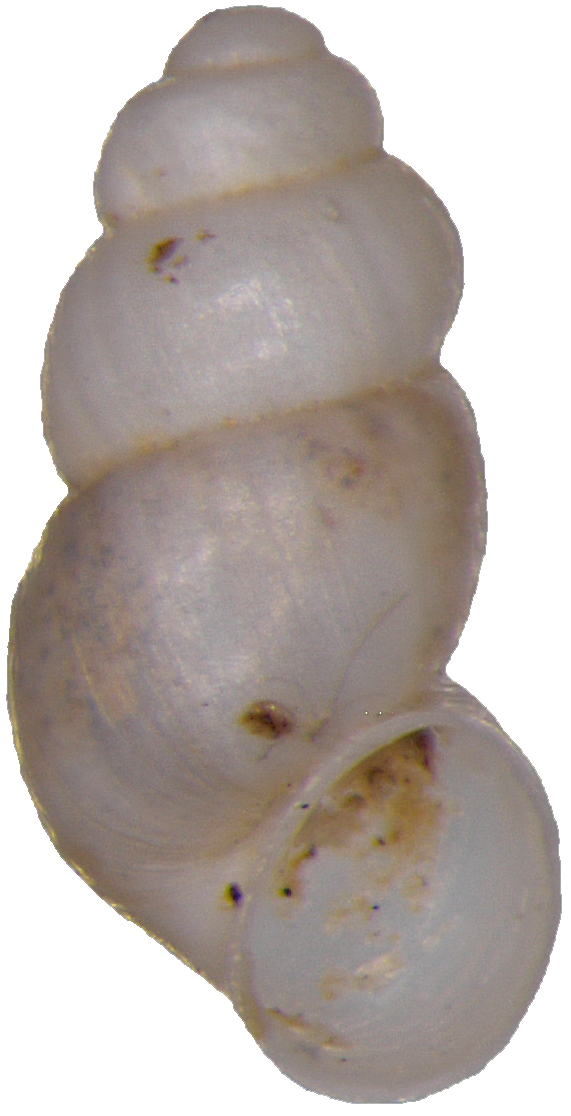
- Apertural view of a shell of Alzoniella slovenica

Conservation status
- Least Concern (IUCN 3.1)

Scientific classification
- Kingdom: Animalia
- Phylum: Mollusca
- Class: Gastropoda
- Subclass: Caenogastropoda
- Order: Littorinimorpha
- Family: Hydrobiidae
- Genus: Alzoniella
- Species: A. slovenica

Binomial name
- Alzoniella slovenica (Ložek & Brtek, 1964)

Synonyms
- Alzoniella alticola (Ložek & Brtek, 1964); Alzoniella bojnicensis; Alzoniella kalasi; Alzoniella slovenica komenskyi; Alzoniella (Alzoniella) slovenica (Ložek & Brtek, 1964) alternative representation; Belgrandiella slovenica alticola Ložek & Brtek, 1964 (junior synonym); Belgrandiella slovenica bojnicensis Ložek & Brtek, 1964 (junior synonym); Belgrandiella slovenica komenskyi Hudec, 1972 (junior synonym); Belgrandiella slovenica Ložek & Brtek, 1964 (junior synonym)

= Alzoniella slovenica =

Species of gastropod

Alzoniella slovenica is a species of very small or minute freshwater snail with an operculum, an aquatic gastropod mollusk in the family Hydrobiidae, which are sometimes known as the snouted water snails.

== Shell description ==
The width of the shell is up to 0.6 mm (0.024 in). The height of the shell is up to 1.7 mm (0.067 in).

Alzoniella slovenica is blind.

== Distribution ==
Distribution of this species is western carpathian.

This species is found in the White Carpathians. It is endemic to Moravia (Czech Republic) and in Slovakia.

Its conservation status in the Czech Republic is endangered and it is "rare" in Slovakia.

== Biotope ==
It is a crenobiotic species: it lives in groundwater and it can be found in water wells.
