= Alzoniella pyrenaica =

Conservation status
- Data Deficient (IUCN 3.1)

Scientific classification
- Kingdom: Animalia
- Phylum: Mollusca
- Class: Gastropoda
- Subclass: Caenogastropoda
- Order: Littorinimorpha
- Family: Hydrobiidae
- Genus: Alzoniella
- Species: A. pyrenaica

Binomial name
- Alzoniella pyrenaica (Boeters, 1983)

Synonyms
- Alzoniella (Alzoniella) pyrenaica (Boeters, 1983) · alternative representation; Belgrandiella pyrenaica Boeters, 1983

Species of gastropod

Alzoniella pyrenaica is a species of minute freshwater snail with a gill and an operculum, an aquatic gastropod mollusk in the family Hydrobiidae.

== Distribution ==
This species is endemic to France. and occurs in the Pyrénées-Atlantiques.
