= Navarriella =

Scientific classification
- Kingdom: Animalia
- Phylum: Mollusca
- Class: Gastropoda
- Subclass: Caenogastropoda
- Order: Littorinimorpha
- Superfamily: Truncatelloidea
- Family: Hydrobiidae
- Subfamily: Navarriellinae; García-Guerrero, J. P. Miller & M. A. Ramos, 2023
- Genus: Navarriella; Boeters, 2000

Type species
- Paludinella elliptica Paladilhe, 1874

Synonyms
- Alzoniella (Navarriella) Boeters, 2000 superseded combination

Genus of gastropods

Navarriella is a genus of minute freshwater spring snails, aquatic gastropod mollusks or micromollusks in the subfamily Navarriellinae of the family Hydrobiidae.

== Species ==
- Navarriella elliptica (Paladilhe, 1874)
