= Navarriella elliptica =

Conservation status
- Vulnerable (IUCN 3.1)

Scientific classification
- Kingdom: Animalia
- Phylum: Mollusca
- Class: Gastropoda
- Subclass: Caenogastropoda
- Order: Littorinimorpha
- Family: Hydrobiidae
- Genus: Navarriella
- Species: N. elliptica

Binomial name
- Navarriella elliptica (Paladilhe, 1874)

Synonyms
- Alzoniella (Navarriella) elliptica (Paladilhe, 1874) alternative representation; Alzoniella (Navarriella) pellitica Arconada, Rolán & Boeters, 2007 junior subjective synonym; Alzoniella elliptica (Paladilhe, 1874) superseded combination; Alzoniella pellitica Arconada, Rolán & Boeters, 2007 junior subjective synonym; Litthabitella elliptica (Paladilhe, 1874) superseded combination; Paludinella elliptica Paladilhe, 1874 (original combination)

Species of gastropod

Navarriella elliptica is a species of very small aquatic snail, a spring snail, an operculate gastropod mollusc in the family Hydrobiidae.

== Description ==
The length of the shell attains 2¼ mm, its diameter 1 mm.

(Original description in French) The shell shows an almost non-existent umbilical slit. The shell is ovoid and slightly swollen. It is pale horn-colored, with little shine, and is almost smooth. The spire is slightly tapered, with the columellar axis slightly curved, making the shell appear a bit more bulging on the left side than on the right. The apex is small and somewhat blunt. It contains 3½ to 4 whorls. These are slightly convex, with very rapid growth, especially from the third whorl onward. They are separated by a narrow, fairly deep suture. The body whorl is very large, accounting for at least half of the total height when viewing the shell from the side opposite the aperture, and is greatly expanded on the side of the aperture, following a slightly downward direction towards it. The free edge is slightly hollowed and stretched a bit downward. The aperture is large and is obliquely elliptical. The peristome is straight and slightly thickened. The outer lip is fairly curved, somewhat protruding, and slightly flared at its junction with the columellar lip, which is oblique, weakly arched, thin, and slightly reflected. The operculum is somewhat recessed into the body whorl. it is brown in color, with faint spiral striations.

== Distribution ==
This species occurs in France, around Ascain (Basses-Pyrénées) and neighbouring Spain (Province of Navarre).
