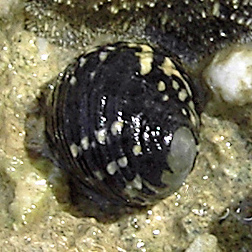
- A live Nerita tessellata on a rock in Guadeloupe

Scientific classification
- Kingdom: Animalia
- Phylum: Mollusca
- Class: Gastropoda
- Order: Cycloneritida
- Superfamily: Neritoidea
- Family: Neritidae
- Subfamily: Neritinae
- Genus: Nerita; Linnaeus, 1758

Type species
- Nerita peloronta Linnaeus, 1758

Synonyms
- Nerita (Adenerita) Dekker, 2000 · accepted, alternate representation; Nerita (Amphinerita) Martens, 1887 · accepted, alternate representation; Nerita (Argonerita) Frey & Vermeij, 2008 · accepted, alternate representation; Nerita (Cymostyla) Martens, 1887 · accepted, alternate representation; Nerita (Heminerita) Martens, 1887 · accepted, alternate representation; Nerita (Ilynerita) Martens, 1887 · accepted, alternate representation; Nerita (Lepidonerita) Vermeij, 1984 · accepted, alternate representation; Nerita (Linnerita) Vermeij, 1984 · accepted, alternate representation; Nerita (Lisanerita) Krijnen, 2002 · accepted, alternate representation; Nerita (Nerita) Linnaeus, 1758 · accepted, alternate representation; Nerita (Odontostoma) Mörch, 1852 (preoccupied by Odontostoma Turton, 1829); Nerita (Peloronta) Oken, 1815; Nerita (Pila) Mörch, 1852 (objective junior synonym; preoccupied by Pila Röding, 1798); Nerita (Ritena) Gray, 1858 · accepted, alternate representation; Nerita (Tenare) Gray, 1858 (objective junior synonym); Nerita (Theliostyla) Mörch, 1852 · accepted, alternate representation; † Neritites Schlotheim, 1820 (invalid under Art. 20: name established for fossils, formed by adding the suffix -ites to the genus name Nerita.); Puperita (Heminerita) Martens, 1887 (superseded combination); Ritena Gray, 1858; Theliostyla Mörch, 1852; Turrita Wagner, 1897

= Nerita =

Genus of gastropods

Nerita is a genus of medium-sized to small sea snails with a gill and an operculum, marine gastropod molluscs in the subfamily Neritinae of the family Neritidae, the nerites.

This is the type genus of the family Neritidae.

== Distribution and habitat ==
Species of Nerita can be found worldwide in tropical waters in the middle and upper intertidal zones. They are gregarious herbivores.

== Description ==
The thick shell is broadly ovate or globular and low-spired. It has a smooth surface. The shells are spirally ribbed or show some axial sculpturing. The ventral side has a large columellar callus or parietal wall. The callus shows small pustules. The aperture and the edge of the columella are usually dentate with fine or robust teeth. The calcareus operculum is thick and can be smooth or with a granular structure. The whorls are covered with strong spiral cords.

== Taxonomy ==
Several subgenera have been proposed over the course of time, but various authors in the past could not agree on the placement of many species. The subgeneric placement of the species of Nerita was revised by Vermeij in 1984. However, inconsistencies still remain over the use and validity of many taxonomic names, because species show a wide variety of colors, patterns and even details of shell morphology, which has given rise to many synonyms.

== Species ==
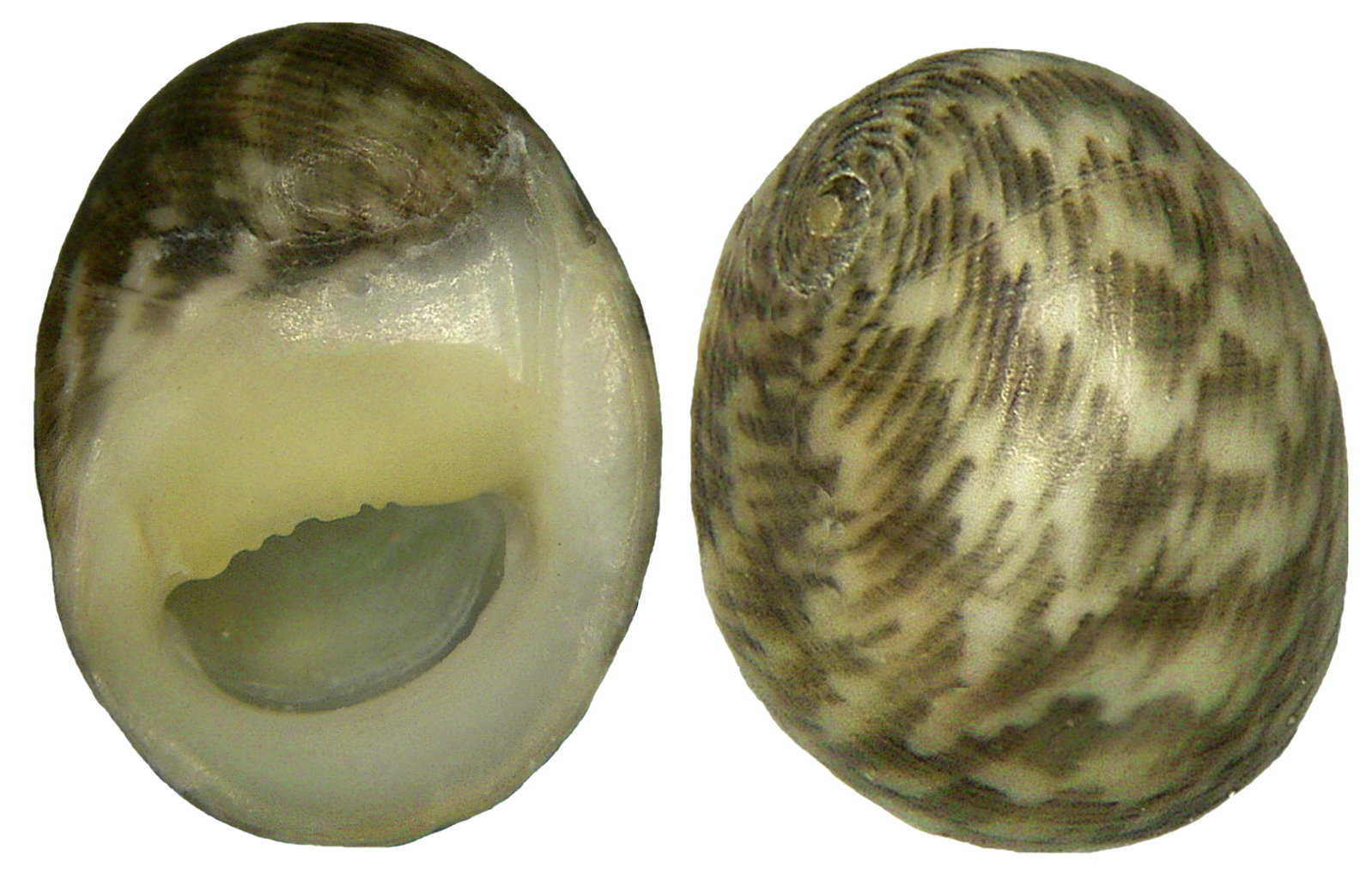
Two views of shells of Nerita polita

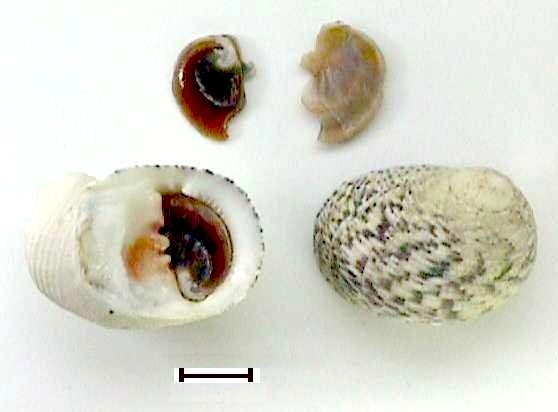
Shell and opercula of Nerita peloronta

Species within the genus Nerita include:

- Nerita adenensis Mienis, 1978
- Nerita albicilla Linnaeus, 1758
- Nerita alveolus Hombron & Jacquinot, 1848
- Nerita antiquata Récluz, 1841
- Nerita apiata Récluz, 1843
- Nerita argus Récluz, 1841
- Nerita ascensionis Gmelin, 1791
- Nerita aterrima Gmelin, 1791
- Nerita atramentosa Reeve, 1855
- Nerita balteata Reeve, 1855: probably congeneric with Nerita articulata
- Nerita chamaeleon Linnaeus, 1758
- Nerita chlorostoma Lamarck, 1816
- Nerita costata Gmelin, 1791
- Nerita costulata von dem Busch, 1844
- † Nerita craigi Symonds, Gain & Belliard, 2017
- Nerita dombeyi Récluz, 1841
- Nerita eichhorsti Krijnen, Gras & Vink, 2018
- Nerita ellyptica Le Guillou, 1841
- Nerita erythrostoma Eichhorst & Neville, 2004
- Nerita essingtoni Récluz, 1842
- Nerita exuvia Linnaeus, 1758
- Nerita filosa Reeve, 1855
- † Nerita fortidentata Vermeij & Collins, 1988
- Nerita fragum Reeve, 1855
- Nerita fulgurans Gmelin, 1791 - Antillean nerite
- Nerita fuliginata Reeve, 1855
- Nerita funiculata Menke, 1851
- Nerita gaimardii Souleyet, 1842
- Nerita grasi Eichhorst, 2016
- Nerita grisea Reeve, 1855
- Nerita grossa Linnaeus, 1758
- Nerita guamensis Quoy & Gaimard, 1834
- Nerita helicinoides Reeve, 1855
- Nerita histrio Linnaeus, 1758
- Nerita incerta Von dem Busch in Philippi, 1844
- Nerita insculpta Récluz, 1841
- Nerita incurva E. von Martens, 1887
- Nerita japonica Dunker, 1860
- Nerita lianae T. Cossignani, 2019
- Nerita lirellata Rehder, 1980
- Nerita litterata Gmelin, 1791
- Nerita longii Récluz, 1842
- Nerita luteonigra Dekker, 2000
- Nerita maculifera Le Guillou, 1841
- Nerita magdalenae Gmelin, 1791
- Nerita maura Récluz, 1842
- Nerita maxima Gmelin, 1791
- Nerita melanotragus E.A. Smith, 1884
- † Nerita minor Sandberger, 1861
- Nerita morio (G.B. Sowerby I, 1833)
- Nerita neritopsoides Reeve, 1855
- Nerita nigerrima Dillwyn, 1817
- Nerita nigrita Röding, 1798
- Nerita novaeguineae Lesson, 1831
- Nerita ocellata Le Guillou, 1841
- Nerita olivaria Le Guillou, 1841
- Nerita orbignyana Récluz, 1841
- Nerita oryzarum Récluz, 1841
- Nerita patula Récluz, 1841
- Nerita peloronta Linnaeus, 1758- bleeding tooth
- Nerita picea Récluz, 1841
- Nerita planospira Anton, 1839
- Nerita plicata Linnaeus, 1758
- Nerita polita Linnaeus, 1758
- Nerita quadricolor Gmelin, 1791
- Nerita quoyi Le Guillou, 1841
- Nerita sanguinolenta Menke, 1829
- Nerita scabricosta Lamarck, 1822
- Nerita semirugosa Récluz, 1841
- Nerita senegalensis Gmelin, 1791
- Nerita signata Lamarck, 1822
- Nerita striata Burrow, 1815
- Nerita subgranosa Mabille, 1895
- † Nerita symondsi Pacaud, 2017
- Nerita tessellata Gmelin, 1791 - checkered nerite
- Nerita textilis Gmelin, 1791
- Nerita trifasciata Le Guillou, 1841
- Nerita umlaasiana Krauss, 1848
- Nerita undata Linnaeus, 1758 (forms a complex)
- Nerita undulata Gmelin, 1791
- Nerita versicolor Gmelin, 1791 - four-tooth nerite
- Nerita vexillum Reeve, 1855
- Nerita vitiensis Hombron & Jacquinot, 1848
- Nerita winteri Philippi, 1844
- Nerita yoldii Récluz, 1841

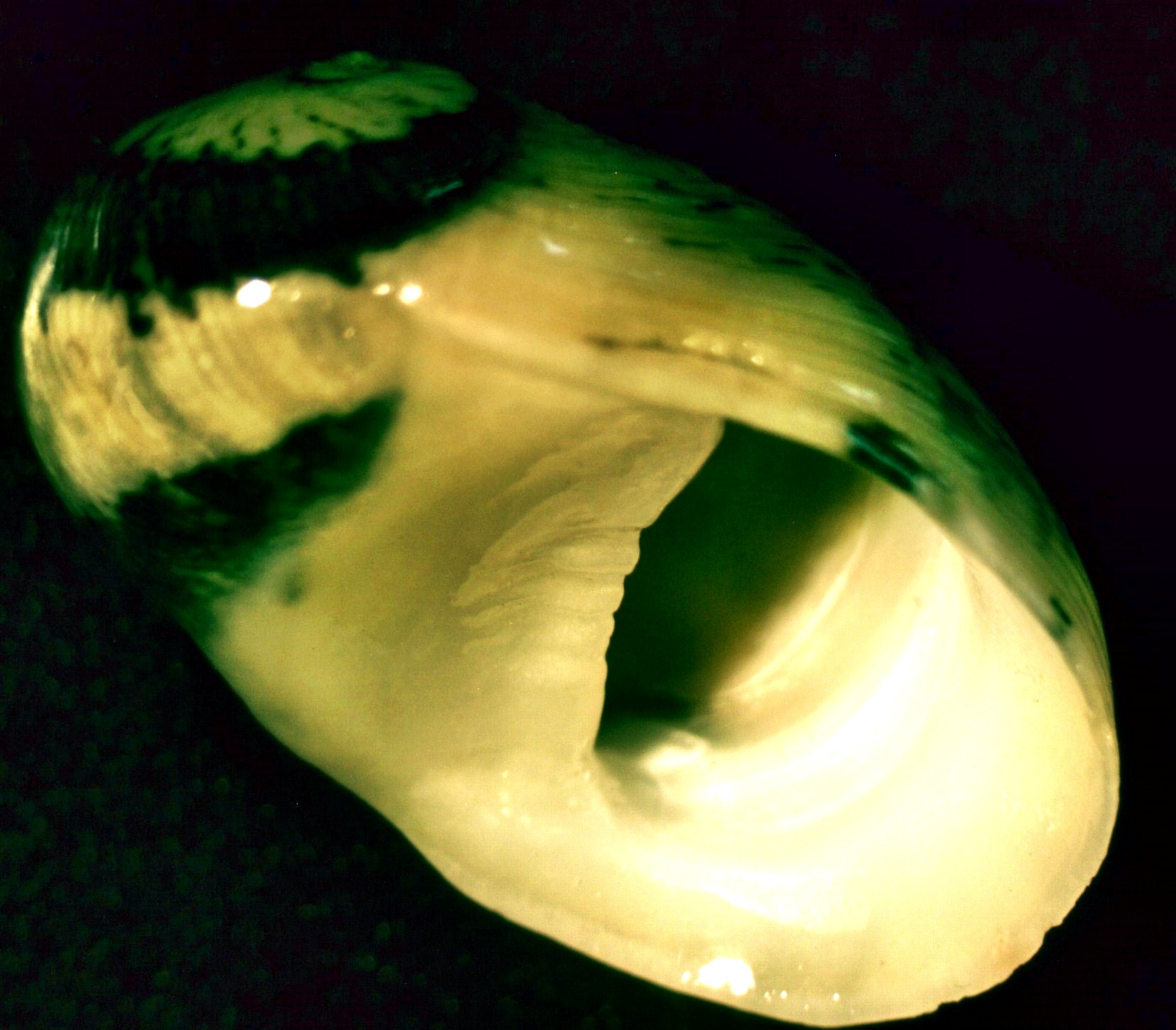
Nerita litterata

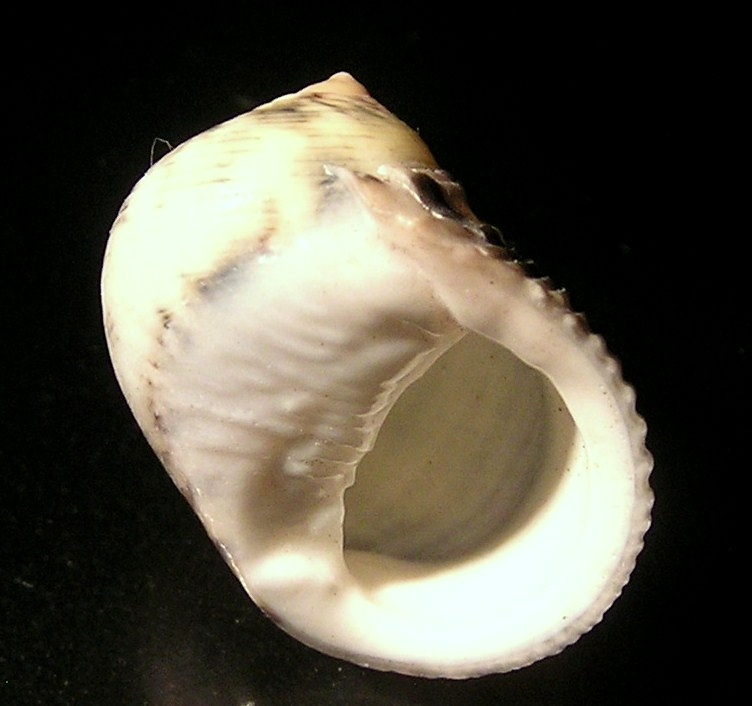
A shell of Nerita trifasciata

The Indo-Pacific Molluscan Database also includes the following species with names in current use:

- Nerita articulata Gould, 1847
- Nerita bicolor Récluz, 1843
- Nerita corrosula Récluz, 1842
- Nerita maxima Gmelin, 1791
- Nerita nigrita Röding, 1798
- Nerita panayensis Récluz, 1844
- Nerita pfeifferiana Récluz, 1843
- Nerita phasiana Récluz, 1842
- Nerita radiata Récluz, 1841
- Nerita sayana Récluz, 1844
- Nerita tenebrosa Récluz, 1842

== Synonyms ==
- Nerita amoena (Gould, 1847): synonym of Neripteron amoenum (A. Gould, 1847) (unaccepted combination)
- Nerita amplisulcata Macsotay & Villarroel, 2001: synonym of Nerita versicolor Gmelin, 1791
- Nerita angularis Hombron & Jacquinot, 1854: synonym of Nerita (Ilynerita) planospira Anton, 1838
- Nerita annulata Reeve, 1855: synonym of Nerita (Argonerita) chamaeleon Linnaeus, 1758
- Nerita anthracina Von dem Busch, 1844: synonym of Nerita (Argonerita) ocellata Le Guillou, 1841
- Nerita arachnoidea Gmelin, 1791: synonym of Natica arachnoidea (Gmelin, 1791)
- Nerita arcta Hombron & Jacquinot, 1854: synonym of Nerita (Amphinerita) insculpta Récluz, 1841
- Nerita arriaca Röding, 1798: synonym of Nerita (Linnerita) polita Linnaeus, 1758
- Nerita asperulata Récluz, 1843: synonym of Neripteron asperulatum (Récluz, 1843) synonym of Neritina asperulata (Récluz, 1843) (original combination)
- Nerita atrata Gmelin, 1791: synonym of Euchelus atratus (Gmelin, 1791)
- Nerita atrata Reeve, 1855: synonym of Nerita (Lisanerita) melanotragus E.A. Smith, 1884
- Nerita atropurpurea Récluz, 1841: synonym of Nerita (Ilynerita) planospira Anton, 1838
- Nerita australis Wood, 1828: synonym of Nerita (Linnerita) erythrostoma Eichhorst & Neville, 2004
- Nerita avellana Récluz, 1842: synonym of Clithon avellana (Récluz, 1842)
- Nerita bensoni Récluz, 1850: synonym of Puperita bensoni (Recluz, 1850)
- Nerita bifasciata Gmelin, 1791: synonym of Nerita (Linnerita) polita Linnaeus, 1758
- Nerita birmanica Troschel, 1878 : synonym of Nerita balteata Reeve, 1855 (a junior synonym)
- Nerita bisecta Reeve, 1855: synonym of Nerita magdalenae Gmelin, 1791
- Nerita bizonalis Lamarck, 1816: synonym of Nerita (Argonerita) chamaeleon Linnaeus, 1758
- Nerita bizonalis Mörch (non Lamarck), 1852: synonym of Nerita (Ilynerita) planospira Anton, 1838
- Nerita bruguierei Récluz, 1841: synonym of Neritina pulligera (Linnaeus, 1767)
- Nerita candida W. Wood, 1825: synonym of Naticarius onca (Röding, 1798)
- Nerita carbonaria Philippi, 1845: synonym of Nerita (Lisanerita) morio (G.B. Sowerby I, 1833)
- Nerita chemnitzii Récluz, 1841: synonym of Nerita semirugosa Récluz, 1841
- Nerita chloroleuca Philippi, 1849: synonym of Nerita (Argonerita) chamaeleon Linnaeus, 1758
- Nerita chrysostoma Récluz, 1841: synonym of Nerita striata Burrow, 1815
- Nerita comma-notata Reeve, 1855: synonym of Nerita (Argonerita) aterrima Gmelin, 1791
- Nerita costata Brocchi, 1814: synonym of Clathrella clathrata (Philippi, 1844)
- Nerita dacostae Récluz, 1844: synonym of Clithon sowerbianum (Récluz, 1843)
- Nerita debilis Dufo, 1840 : synonym of Mienerita debilis (Dufo, 1840)
- Nerita doreyana Quoy & Gaimard, 1834: synonym of Nerita (Linnerita) litterata Gmelin, 1791, synonym of Nerita litterata Gmelin, 1791
- Nerita dubia Turton, 1932: synonym of Neritina auriculata Lamarck, 1816
- Nerita flammulata Récluz, 1841: synonym of Nerita undulata Gmelin, 1791
- Nerita flava Mörch, 1852: synonym of Nerita (Linnerita) litterata Gmelin, 1791
- Nerita flavescens Dillwyn, 1817: synonym of Nerita (Linnerita) polita Linnaeus, 1758
- Nerita forskali Récluz, 1841: synonym of Nerita sanguinolenta Menke, 1829
- Nerita fulminea Gmelin, 1791: synonym of Natica fulminea (Gmelin, 1791)
- Nerita georgina Récluz, 1841: synonym of Nerita (Amphinerita) insculpta Récluz, 1841
- Nerita grayana Récluz, 1843: synonym of Nerita undulata Gmelin, 1791
- Nerita grayana Récluz, 1844: synonym of Nerita essingtoni Récluz, 1842
- Nerita haneti Récluz, 1841: synonym of Nerita (Lisanerita) morio (G.B. Sowerby I, 1833)
- Nerita hieroglyphica Dillwyn, 1817: synonym of Nerita (Linnerita) litterata Gmelin, 1791
- Nerita hilleana Dunker, 1871: synonym of Nerita (Amphinerita) insculpta Récluz, 1841
- Nerita hindsii Récluz, 1844: synonym of Nerita (Argonerita) squamulata Le Guillou, 1841
- Nerita histrio Linnaeus, 1758: synonym of Nerita (Argonerita) squamulata Le Guillou, 1841
- Nerita interrupta Récluz, 1843: synonym of Clithon faba (G. B. Sowerby I, 1836)
- Nerita intricata Donovan, 1804: synonym of Payraudeautia intricata (Donovan, 1804)
- Nerita islandica Gmelin, 1791: synonym of Amauropsis islandica (Gmelin, 1791)
- Nerita jovis Récluz, 1843: synonym of Vittina jovis (Récluz, 1843)
- Nerita junghuhni Schepman, 1901: synonym of Nerita (Amphinerita) olivaria Le Guillou, 1841
- Nerita laevilirata Sowerby, 1914: synonym of Nerita (Argonerita) chamaeleon Linnaeus, 1758
- Nerita larva Gmelin, 1791: synonym of Nerita (Linnerita) litterata Gmelin, 1791
- Nerita leucozonias Gmelin, 1791: synonym of Natica vitellus (Linnaeus, 1758)
- Nerita lineata Chemnitz, 1774 - lined nerite: synonym of Nerita balteata Reeve, 1855
- Nerita listeri Récluz, 1841: synonym of Nerita (Amphinerita) insculpta Récluz, 1841
- Nerita litoralis Turton, 1819: synonym of Littorina obtusata (Linnaeus, 1758)
- Nerita maculata Pease, 1867: synonym of Nerita (Argonerita) argus Récluz, 1841
- Nerita mammilla Linnaeus, 1758: synonym of Polinices mammilla (Linnaeus, 1758)
- Nerita marinduquenensis Vallejo, 2000: synonym of Nerita patula Récluz, 1841
- Nerita marmorata Hombron & Jacquinot, 1854: synonym of Nerita (Argonerita) chamaeleon Linnaeus, 1758
- Nerita marochiensis Gmelin, 1791: synonym of Natica marochiensis (Gmelin, 1791)
- Nerita mascareignar Récluz, 1850: synonym of Nerita (Argonerita) aterrima Gmelin, 1791
- Nerita mauritiae Récluz, 1841: synonym of Nerita (Argonerita) aterrima Gmelin, 1791
- Nerita melanostoma Gmelin, 1791: synonym of Mammilla melanostoma (Gmelin, 1791)
- Nerita menkeana Récluz, 1842: synonym of Clithon olivaceum (Récluz, 1843)
- Nerita modesta Hombron & Jacquinot, 1854: synonym of Nerita (Argonerita) chamaeleon Linnaeus, 1758
- Nerita neritinoides Reeve, 1855: synonym of Nerita (Lisanerita) morio (G.B. Sowerby I, 1833)
- Nerita nigra Dillwyn, 1817: synonym of Nerita (Linnerita) polita Linnaeus, 1758
- Nerita nodosa Linnaeus, 1758: synonym of Thais (Thais) nodosa (Linnaeus, 1758)
- Nerita obscura Hombron & Jacquinot, 1854: synonym of Nerita (Argonerita) ocellata Le Guillou, 1841
- Nerita opaca Röding, 1798: synonym of Nerita (Linnerita) polita Linnaeus, 1758
- Nerita orbignyana Récluz, 1841: synonym of Nerita (Linnerita) litterata Gmelin, 1791
- Nerita orientalis Gmelin, 1791: synonym of Naticarius orientalis (Gmelin, 1791)
- Nerita pacifica Récluz, 1850: synonym of Nerita (Amphinerita) insculpta Récluz, 1841
- Nerita panayana Récluz, 1843: synonym of Nerita litterata Gmelin, 1791
- Nerita papilla Gmelin, 1791: synonym of Eunaticina papilla (Gmelin, 1791)
- Nerita pennata Born, 1778: synonym of Vittina pennata (Born, 1778)
- Nerita petechialis Mörch, 1852: synonym of Nerita (Argonerita) signata Lamarck, 1822
- Nerita pica Gould, 1859: synonym of Nerita japonica Dunker, 1860
- Nerita picta Humphrey, 1797: synonym of Nerita (Linnerita) polita Linnaeus, 1758
- Nerita piscinalis O. F. Müller, 1774: synonym of Valvata piscinalis (O. F. Müller, 1774)
- Nerita plexa Dillwyn, 1817: synonym of Nerita textilis Gmelin, 1791
- Nerita punctata Quoy & Gaimard, 1834: synonym of Nerita (Argonerita) aterrima Gmelin, 1791
- Nerita pygmaea Martens, 1889: synonym of Nerita (Argonerita) signata Lamarck, 1822
- Nerita reticulata Karsten, 1789: synonym of Nerita (Argonerita) signata Lamarck, 1822
- Nerita rudis Wood, 1828: synonym of Nerita (Argonerita) signata Lamarck, 1822
- Nerita rufa Montagu, 1808: synonym of Lunatia montagui (Forbes, 1838)
- Nerita rufa Born, 1778: synonym of Natica vitellus (Linnaeus, 1758)
- Nerita rumphii Récluz, 1841: synonym of Nerita (Linnerita) litterata Gmelin, 1791
- Nerita rustica Nardo, 1847: synonym of Littorina saxatilis (Olivi, 1792)
- Nerita samoensis Dunker, 1869: synonym of Nerita (Argonerita) signata Lamarck, 1822
- Nerita saturata Hutton, 1884: synonym of Nerita (Lisanerita) melanotragus E.A. Smith, 1884
- Nerita scabrella Philippi, 1849: synonym of Nerita (Argonerita) chamaeleon Linnaeus, 1758
- Nerita schmeltziana Dunker, 1869: synonym of Nerita (Argonerita) argus Récluz, 1841
- Nerita souleyetana Récluz, 1842: synonym of Clithon souleyetanum (Récluz, 1842)
- Nerita spadicea (Gmelin, 1791): synonym of Natica spadicea (Gmelin, 1791)
- Nerita spengleriana Recluz, 1844: synonym of Nerita trifasciata Le Guillou, 1841
- Nerita squamulata Le Guillou, 1841: synonym of Nerita histrio Linnaeus, 1758
- Nerita stella Dillwyn, 1817: synonym of Nerita (Argonerita) squamulata Le Guillou, 1841
- Nerita stercusmuscarum Gmelin, 1791: synonym of Natica stercusmuscarum (Gmelin, 1791)
- Nerita stricta Baird, 1873: synonym of Nerita (Amphinerita) insculpta Récluz, 1841
- Nerita succinea Récluz, 1841: synonym of Neritilia succinea (Récluz, 1841)
- Nerita tomlini Turton, 1933: synonym of Neritina auriculata Lamarck, 1816
- Nerita tristis Pilsbry, 1901: synonym of Nerita helicinoides var. tristis Pilsbry, 1901
- Nerita vitellus Linnaeus, 1758: synonym of Natica vitellus (Linnaeus, 1758)
- Nerita vitiensis Hombron & Jacquinot, 1854: synonym of Nerita (Linnerita) litterata Gmelin, 1791
- Nerita vittata Gmelin, 1791: synonym of Natica vittata (Gmelin, 1791)
