= N. maculata =

N. maculata may refer to:

- Nabalua maculata, a Southeast Asian cicada
- Narcine maculata, an electric ray
- Nausithoe maculata, a crown jellyfish
- Naxidia maculata, a geometer moth
- Nemophila maculata, a plant endemic to California
- Neoregelia maculata, a plant endemic to Brazil
- Neotinea maculata, an Old World orchid
- Nepanthia maculata, an eastern Pacific starfish
- Nephila maculata, a golden orb-web spider
- Nerita maculata, a sea snail
- Nervilia maculata, a flowering plant
- Ninia maculata, a coffee snake
- Noctua maculata, an owlet moth
- Nola maculata, an Asian moth
- Nomada maculata, a cuckoo bee
- Notocelis maculata, an invertebrate animal
- Notonecta maculata, a British backswimmer
- Nyctemera maculata, an Indonesian moth
- Nymphaea maculata, a water lily
