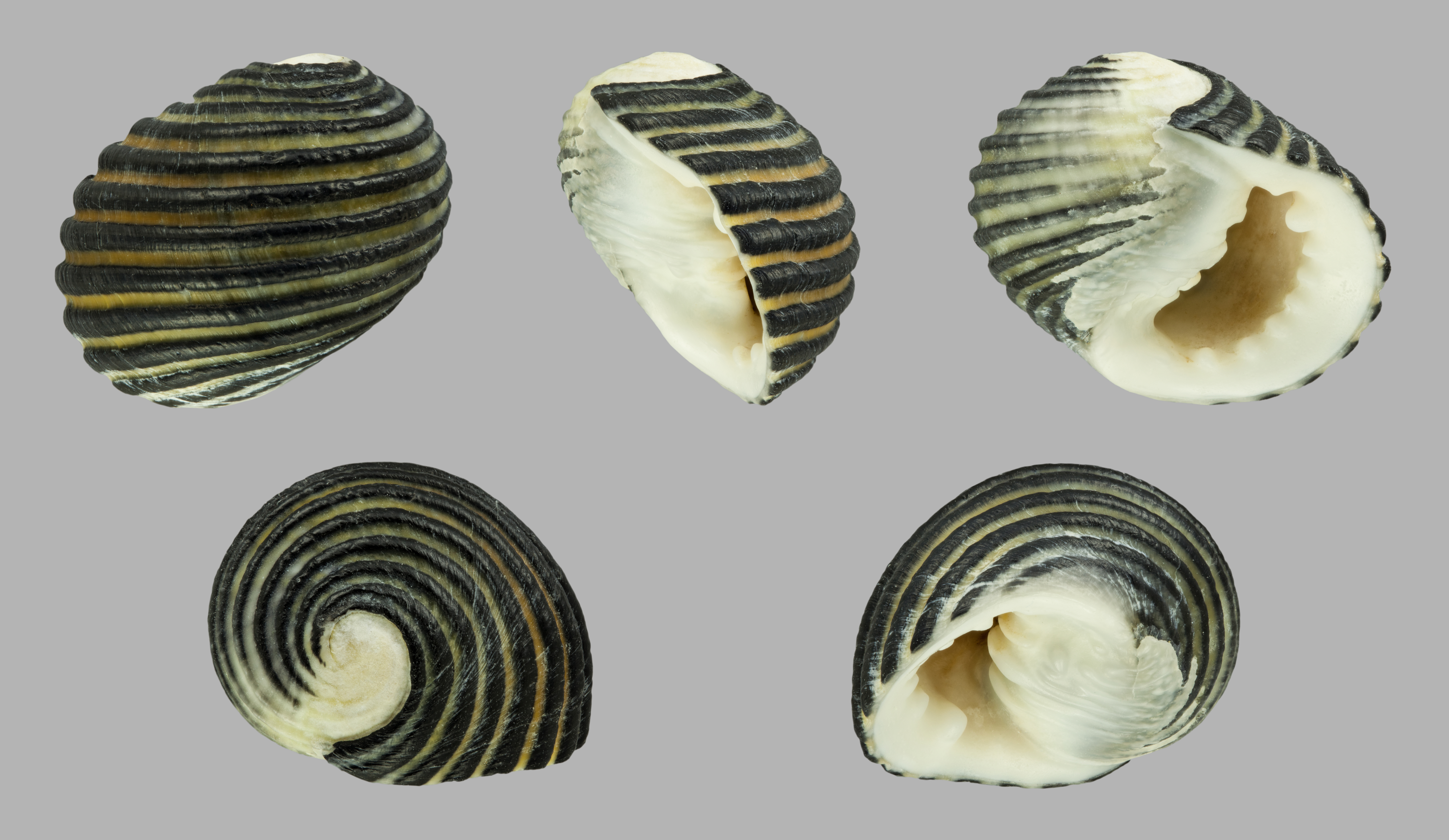

Scientific classification
- Kingdom: Animalia
- Phylum: Mollusca
- Class: Gastropoda
- Order: Cycloneritida
- Family: Neritidae
- Genus: Nerita
- Species: N. costata

Binomial name
- Nerita costata Gmelin, 1791

= Nerita costata =

Species of gastropod

Nerita costata is a species of sea snail, a marine gastropod mollusk in the family Neritidae.
