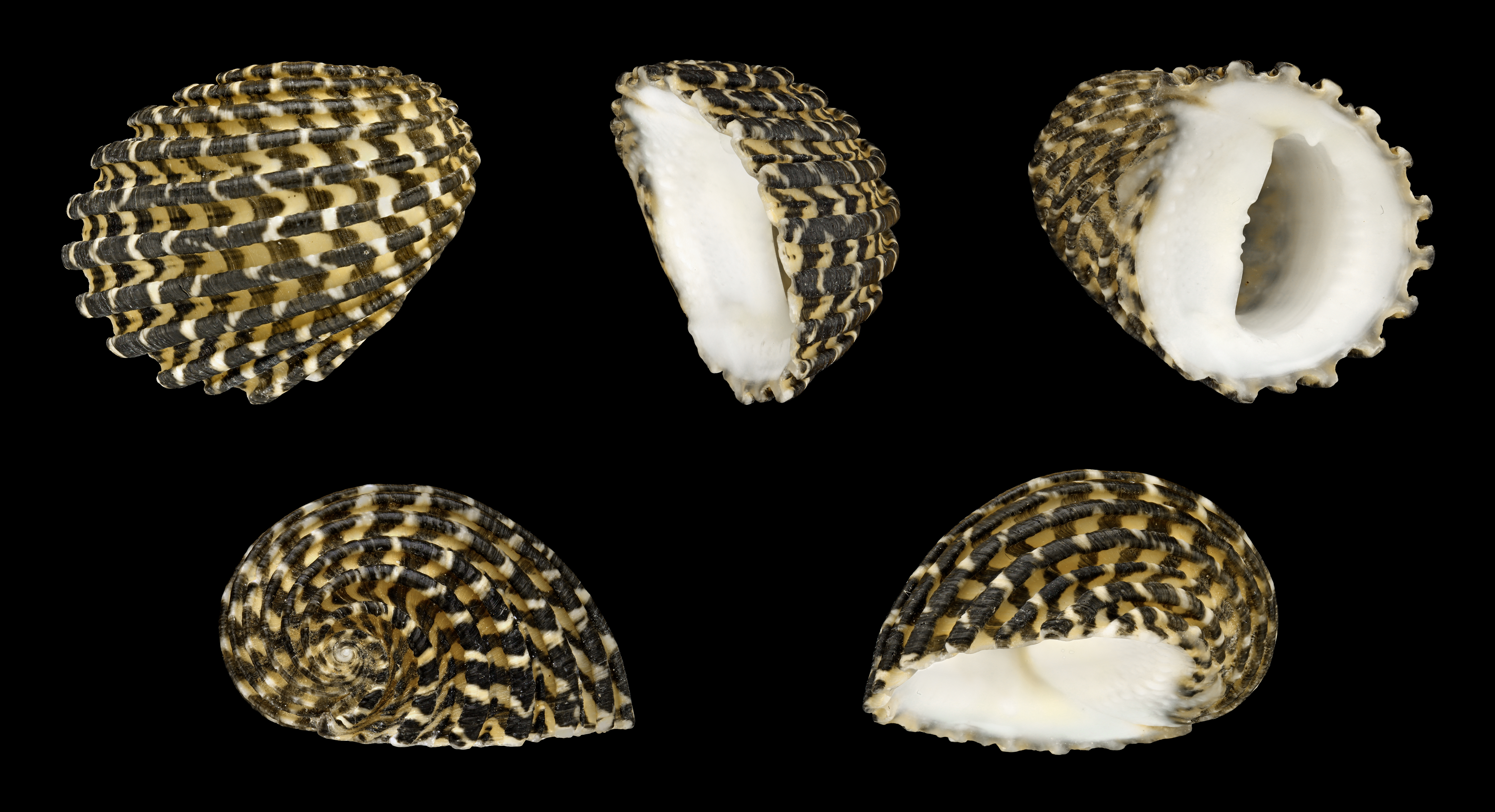
- Five views of a shell of Nerita exuvia

Scientific classification
- Kingdom: Animalia
- Phylum: Mollusca
- Class: Gastropoda
- Order: Cycloneritida
- Family: Neritidae
- Genus: Nerita
- Species: N. exuvia

Binomial name
- Nerita exuvia Linnaeus, 1758

= Nerita exuvia =

Species of gastropod

Nerita exuvia, commonly known as the snakeskin nerite, is a medium-sized species of sea snail, a marine gastropod mollusc in the family Neritidae, the nerites.
