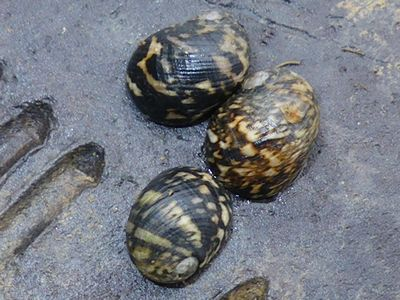

Scientific classification
- Kingdom: Animalia
- Phylum: Mollusca
- Class: Gastropoda
- Order: Cycloneritida
- Family: Neritidae
- Genus: Nerita
- Species: N. japonica

Binomial name
- Nerita japonica Dunker, 1860

Synonyms
- Nerita pica Gould, 1859

= Nerita japonica =

Species of gastropod

Nerita japonica (Japanese: アマガイ(蜑貝), romanized: Amagai,Korean: 갈고둥, romanized: Galgodung) is a species of sea snail, a marine gastropod mollusk in the family Neritidae.

Nerita japonica is the type species of the subgenus Heminerita von Martens, 1887.

== Description ==
Adult shells are 10–20 mm in both shell diameter and shell height. The shell is hemispherical and hard. The body layer (the lowest part of the winding) is greatly developed, like other molluscs of the family Nebulaidae. The spire has four floors, but it is small and protrudes obliquely upward.

The shell surface is dull and varies from weak spiral ribs and growth lines to almost smooth. The ground color is black, and there are yellow-white to orange triangular spots and lightning-bolt-shaped vertical lines, but it is rich in individual variation and various patterns can be seen. In some older individuals, the surface of the shell is abraded to a uniform yellow-gray to gray-brown color. The shell mouth is D-shaped, and a yellow smooth layer spreads around it.

== Distribution ==
It is a hemispherical snail found on reefs and rocky areas along the coasts of southern Honshu, Shikoku, Kyushu, and the southern part of the Korean Peninsula .It has a narrow distribution area as a member of the family Amaranthus, and many related species are distributed in the tropical waters south of the Nansei Islands, but this species is not distributed
