= Nerita patula =

Scientific classification
- Kingdom: Animalia
- Phylum: Mollusca
- Class: Gastropoda
- Order: Cycloneritida
- Family: Neritidae
- Genus: Nerita
- Species: N. patula

Binomial name
- Nerita patula Récluz, 1841

Synonyms
- Nerita (Theliostyla) patula Récluz, 1841· accepted, alternate representation; Nerita beaniana Récluz, 1843; Nerita marinduquenensis Vallejo, 2000; Nerita musiva A. Gould, 1847; Nerita unidentata Hombron & Jacquinot, 1848

Species of gastropod

Nerita patula is a species of sea snail, a marine gastropod mollusk in the family Neritidae.

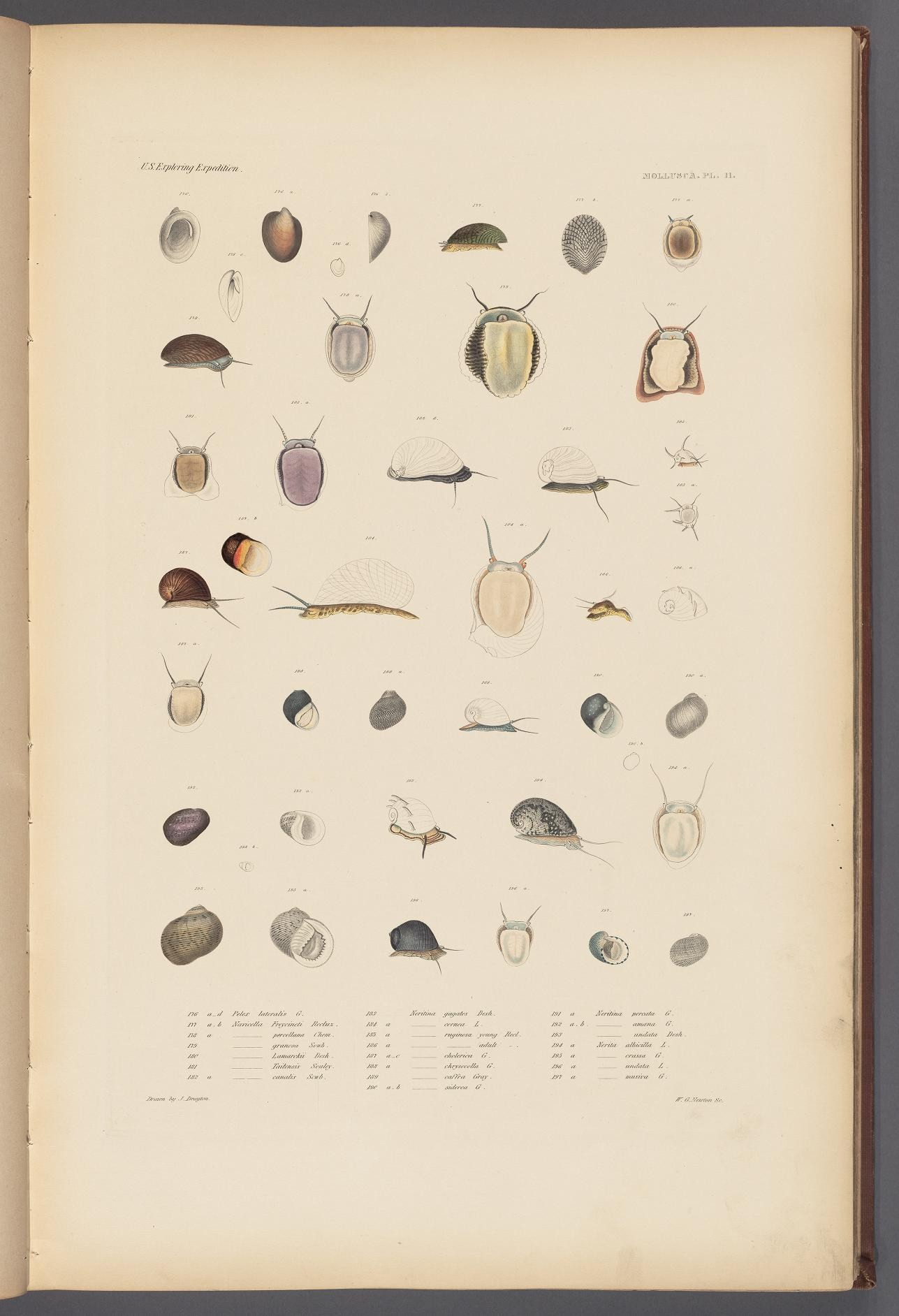
Fig 197.
