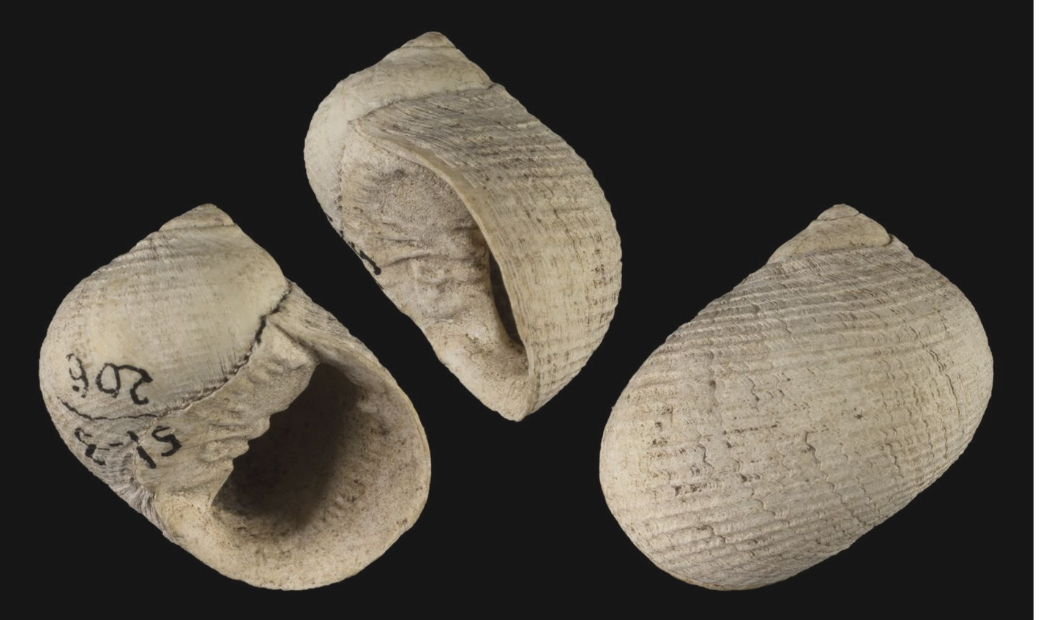
- Shell of Nerita filosa (iconotype at MNHN, Paris)

Scientific classification
- Kingdom: Animalia
- Phylum: Mollusca
- Class: Gastropoda
- Order: Cycloneritida
- Family: Neritidae
- Genus: Nerita
- Species: N. filosa

Binomial name
- Nerita filosa Reeve, 1855

Synonyms
- Nerita (Cymostyla) filosa Reeve, 1855 alternative representation; Nerita (Ritena) filosa Reeve, 1855

= Nerita filosa =

Species of gastropod

Nerita filosa, common name the threaded nerite, is a species of sea snail, a marine gastropod mollusk in the family Neritidae.

== Description ==
(Original description) The shell is globosely turbinate, with an exserted, sharp-pointed spire. Its whorls slant at the upper part, then become convex, and are spirally threaded with minutely divided ridges. The outer lip is inwardly thickened, minutely crenulated, and features a sharp lateral denticle on each side. The columella is smooth and finely toothed. The shell's color is rusty fawn, with the ridges delicately blue-black.

== Distribution ==
This marine species occurs Vanuatu and New Caledonia.
