= Nerita picea =

- Shell of Nerita picea

Scientific classification
- Kingdom: Animalia
- Phylum: Mollusca
- Class: Gastropoda
- Order: Cycloneritida
- Family: Neritidae
- Genus: Nerita
- Species: N. picea

Binomial name
- Nerita picea Récluz, 1841

Synonyms
- Nerita (Ritena) picea Récluz, 1841· accepted, alternate representation; Nerita obscura Hombron & Jacquinot, 1848; Neritina bullula Reeve, 1856; Neritina insculpta Reeve, 1856

Species of mollusc

Nerita Picea, also called Hawaiian black nerite or Pipipi in Hawaiian, is a species of marine gastropod mollusc in the family Neritidae commonly found in clusters on the high part of the intertidal zone. This species is found all throughout the Hawaiian coastline and is endemic to the Hawaiian Islands. In Hawai‘i black nerite are enjoyed as a snack when boiled.

== Description ==
Nerita picea is a marine snail with an ovate shaped shell that is dark blue to black in color on the outside and internally white. Nerita picea range in size from 5–20mm when mature. Nerita picea have a rather solid calcareous shell with little ridges that gives texture to the shell.

== Distribution ==
Nerita picea is a species endemic to the Hawaiian Islands.

== Habitat ==
The habitat of Black Nerite consists of the higher sections of the intertidal zone usually found in clusters in the crevices and pockets of the rocky shoreline.

== Human use ==
In Hawaiian culture, Nerita picea or Pipipi are often eaten boiled, as part of a soup, or eaten raw.

on the rocks

in the intertidal zone

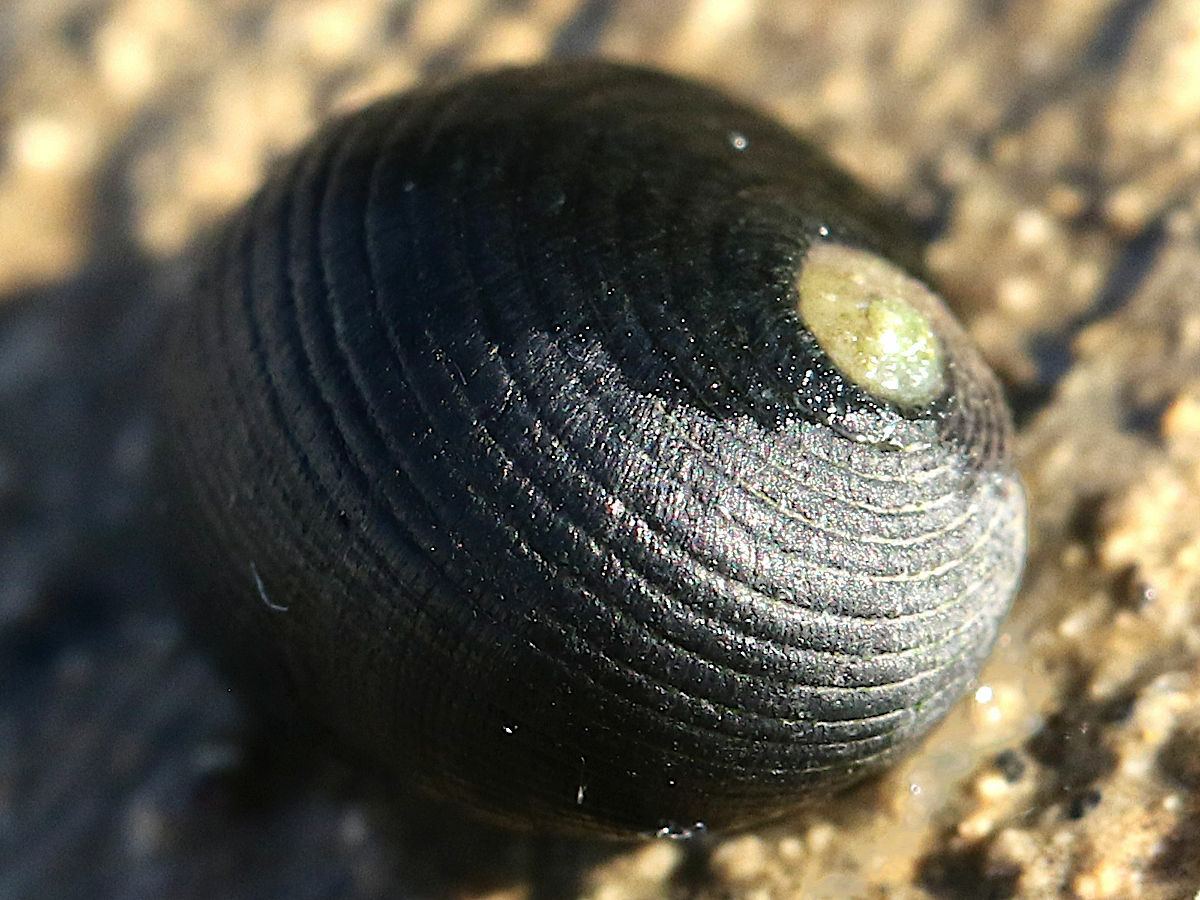
dorsal view

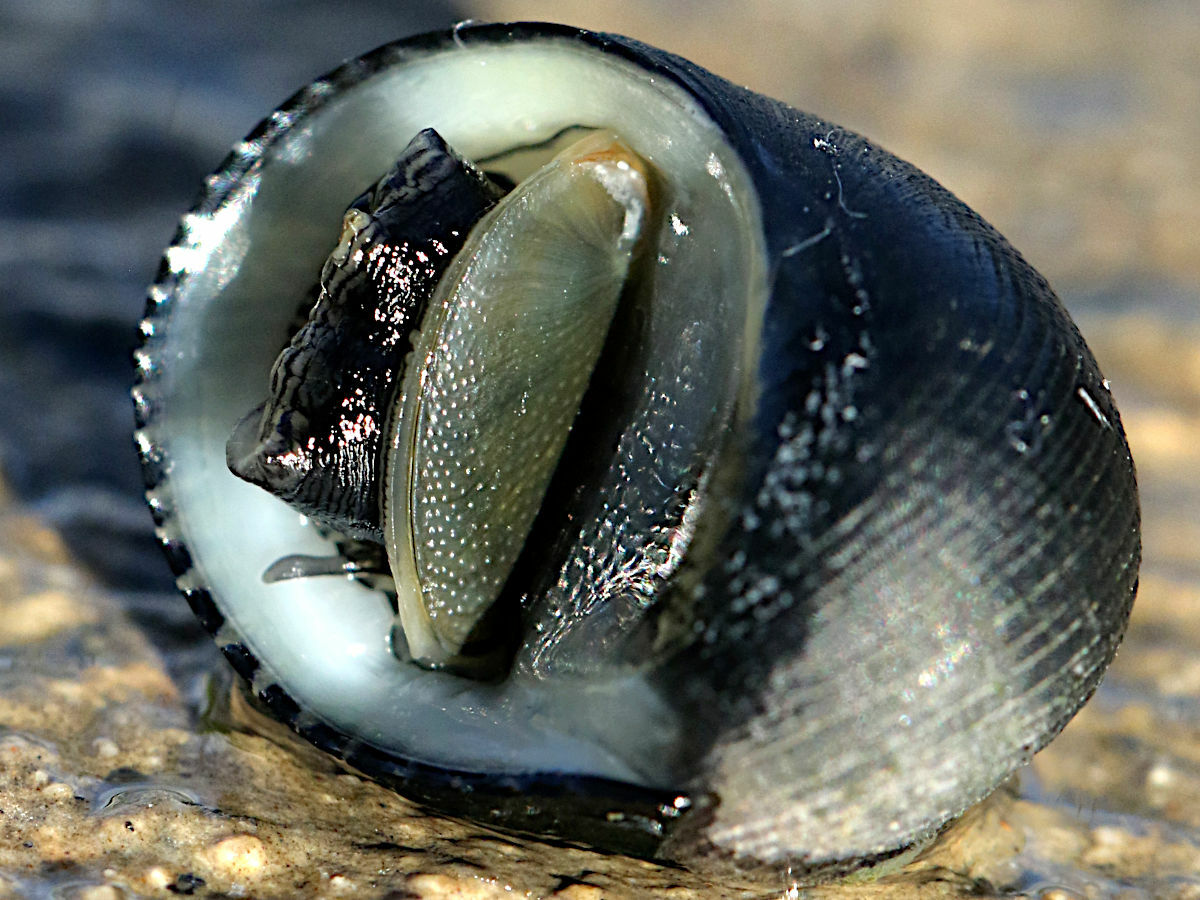
ventral view
