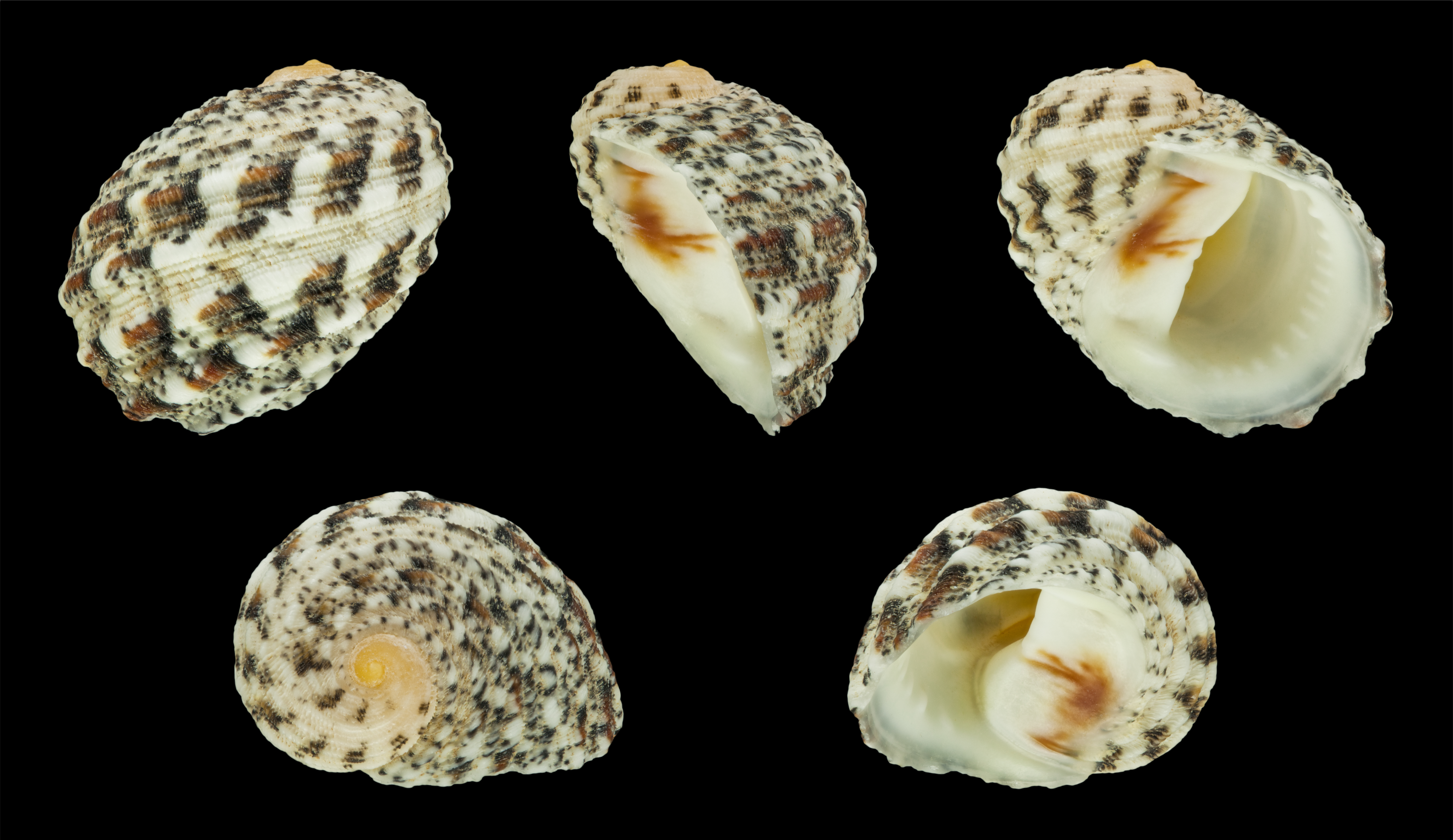

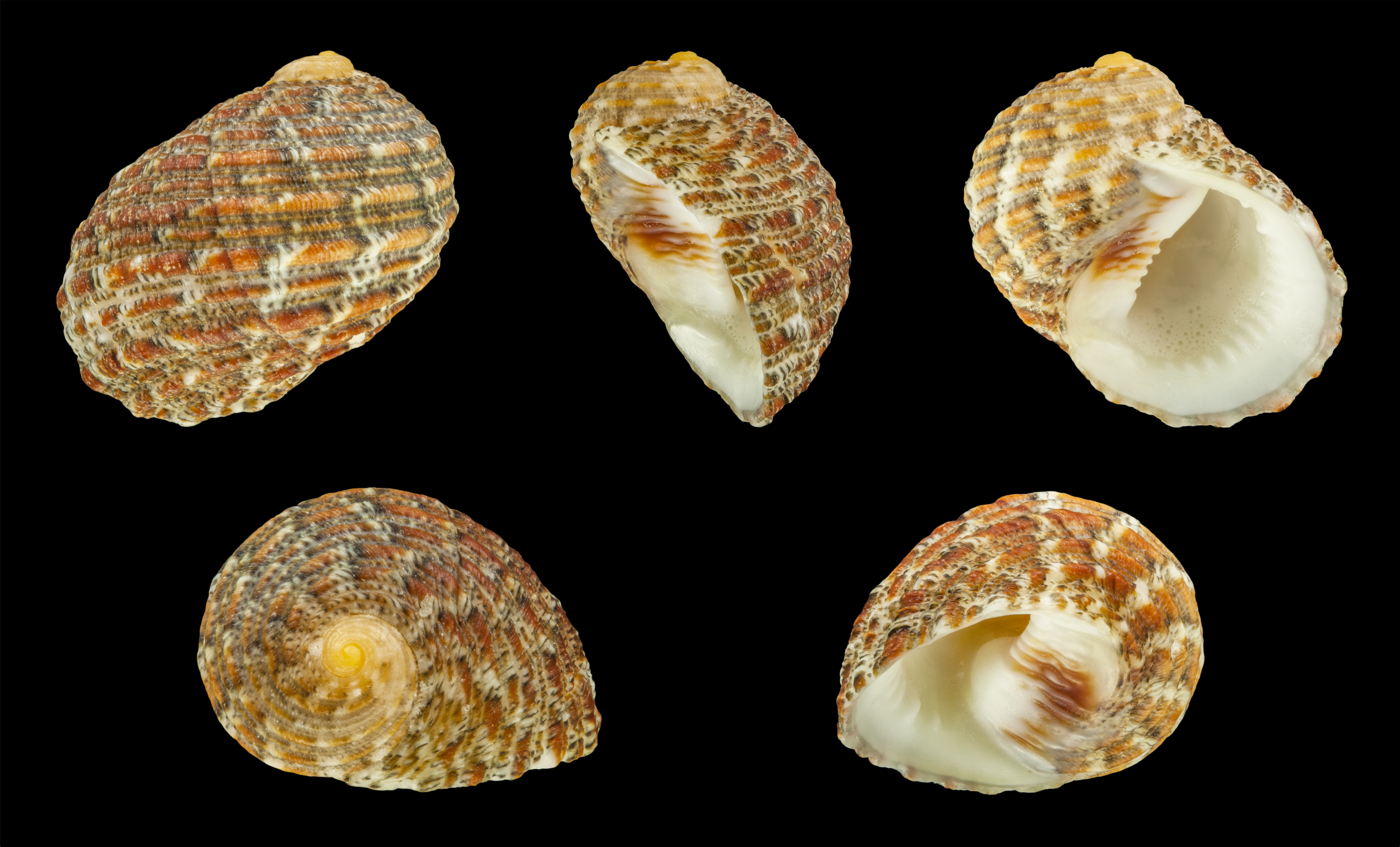

Scientific classification
- Kingdom: Animalia
- Phylum: Mollusca
- Class: Gastropoda
- Order: Cycloneritida
- Family: Neritidae
- Genus: Nerita
- Species: N. signata

Binomial name
- Nerita signata Lamarck, 1822

Synonyms
- Nerita (Argonerita) signata Lamarck, 1822; Nerita petechialis Mörch, 1852; Nerita pygmaea Martens, 1889; Nerita reticulata Karsten, 1789; Nerita reticulata var. pygmaea Martens, 1889; Nerita rudis Wood, 1828; Nerita samoensis Dunker, 1869; Nerita siquata

= Nerita signata =

Species of gastropod

Nerita signata also known as the reticulated nerite, is a species of sea snail, a marine gastropod mollusk in the family Neritidae.

== Description ==
The size of the shell attains 7-20 mm.

== Distribution and habitat ==
This species occurs off Papua New Guinea where it can be found in marine intertidal areas in mid littoral zones.
