= Nerita lirellata =

Scientific classification
- Kingdom: Animalia
- Phylum: Mollusca
- Class: Gastropoda
- Order: Cycloneritida
- Family: Neritidae
- Genus: Nerita
- Species: N. lirellata

Binomial name
- Nerita lirellata Rehder, 1980

Species of gastropod

Nerita lirellata is a species of sea snail with a gill and an operculum, a marine gastropod mollusk in the family Neritidae.
