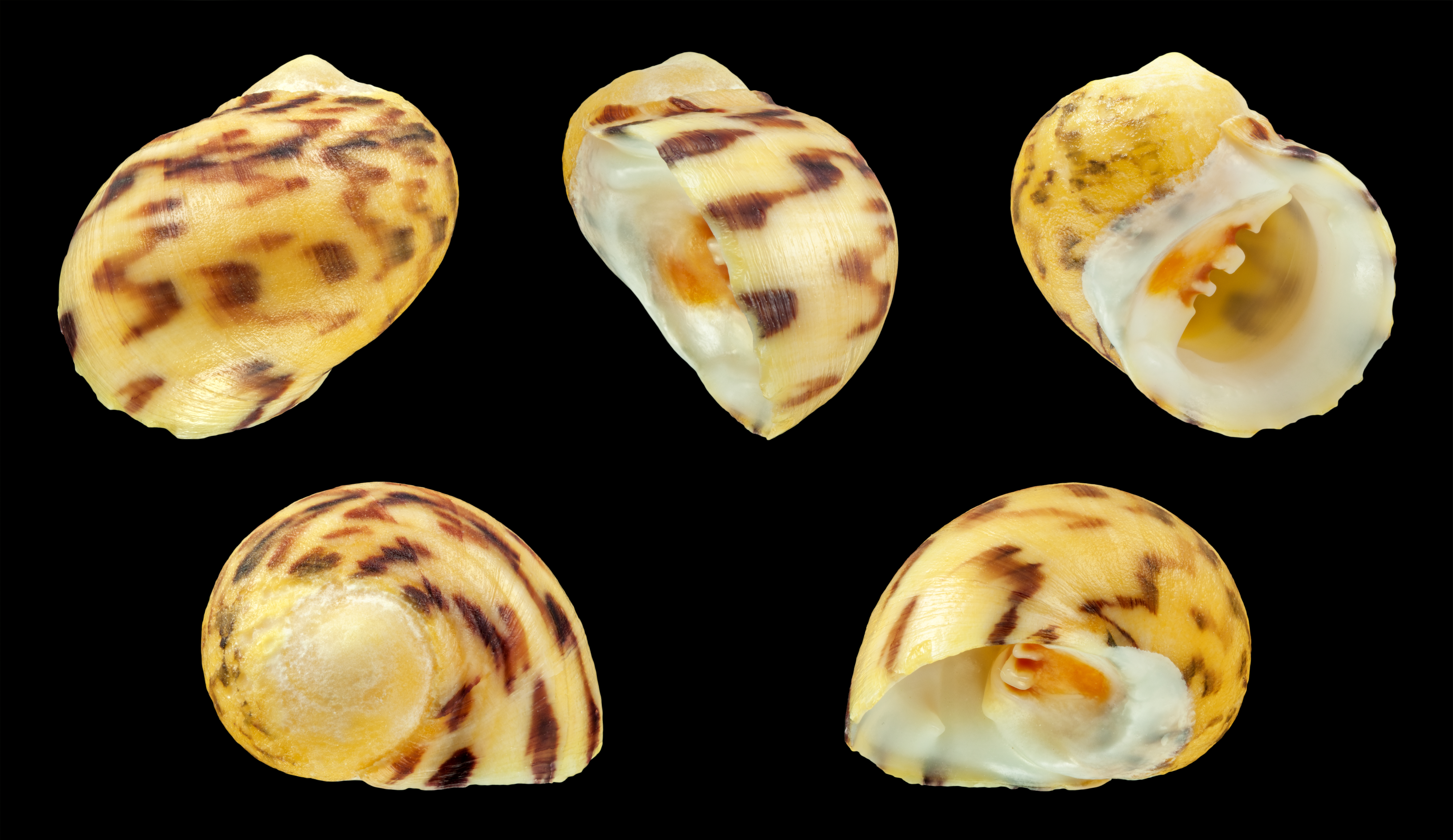
- Shell of Nerita peloronta

Scientific classification
- Kingdom: Animalia
- Phylum: Mollusca
- Class: Gastropoda
- Order: Cycloneritida
- Family: Neritidae
- Genus: Nerita
- Species: N. peloronta

Binomial name
- Nerita peloronta Linnaeus, 1758

Synonyms
- Nerita papilio Röding, 1798; Nerita virginea Röding, 1798; Nerita erythrodon Récluz, 1850; Nerita sanguidens Récluz, 1850

= Nerita peloronta =

Species of gastropod

Nerita peloronta, common name the "bleeding tooth", is a species of sea snail, a marine gastropod mollusc in the family Neritidae.

== Description ==
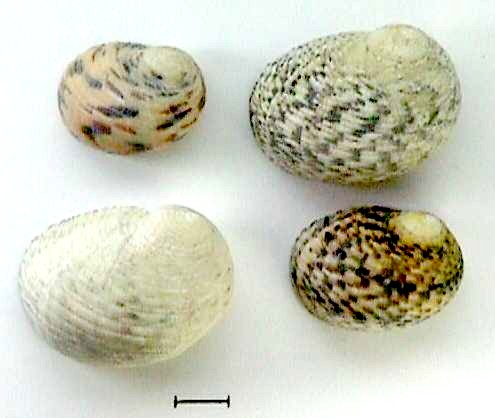
Variation in coloring of the outer surface of the shell of Nerita peloronta

The shell of this species is large compared with many other Nerite species, reaching lengths of 2 inches. The shell is thick and short spired. Its surface can have slightly raised spiral ridges. The dark red operculum is granulated on its inner side. The color of the shell is yellow, reddish, or creamy, with darker streaks or zigzags. Although many nerites have "teeth" on the columellar edge, this species is notable for the fact that it has an area of red coloration next to the "teeth", hence the common name "Bleeding Tooth".

== Distribution ==
Intertidal splash zones on hard rocky shorelines facing regular wave action. West Indies, West Florida, Bermuda, and the Caribbean.
