= Nerita adenensis =

Scientific classification
- Kingdom: Animalia
- Phylum: Mollusca
- Class: Gastropoda
- Order: Cycloneritida
- Family: Neritidae
- Genus: Nerita
- Species: N. adenensis

Binomial name
- Nerita adenensis Mienis, 1978

Species of gastropod

Nerita adenensis, also called the Aden Nerite, is a species of sea snail, a marine gastropod mollusk in the family Neritidae.

== Distribution ==
The mollusk is near the red sea, near Aden.
