= Nerita luteonigra =

Scientific classification
- Kingdom: Animalia
- Phylum: Mollusca
- Class: Gastropoda
- Order: Cycloneritida
- Family: Neritidae
- Genus: Nerita
- Species: N. luteonigra

Binomial name
- Nerita luteonigra Dekker, 2000

Species of gastropod

Nerita luteonigra is a species of sea snail, a marine gastropod mollusk in the family Neritidae.
