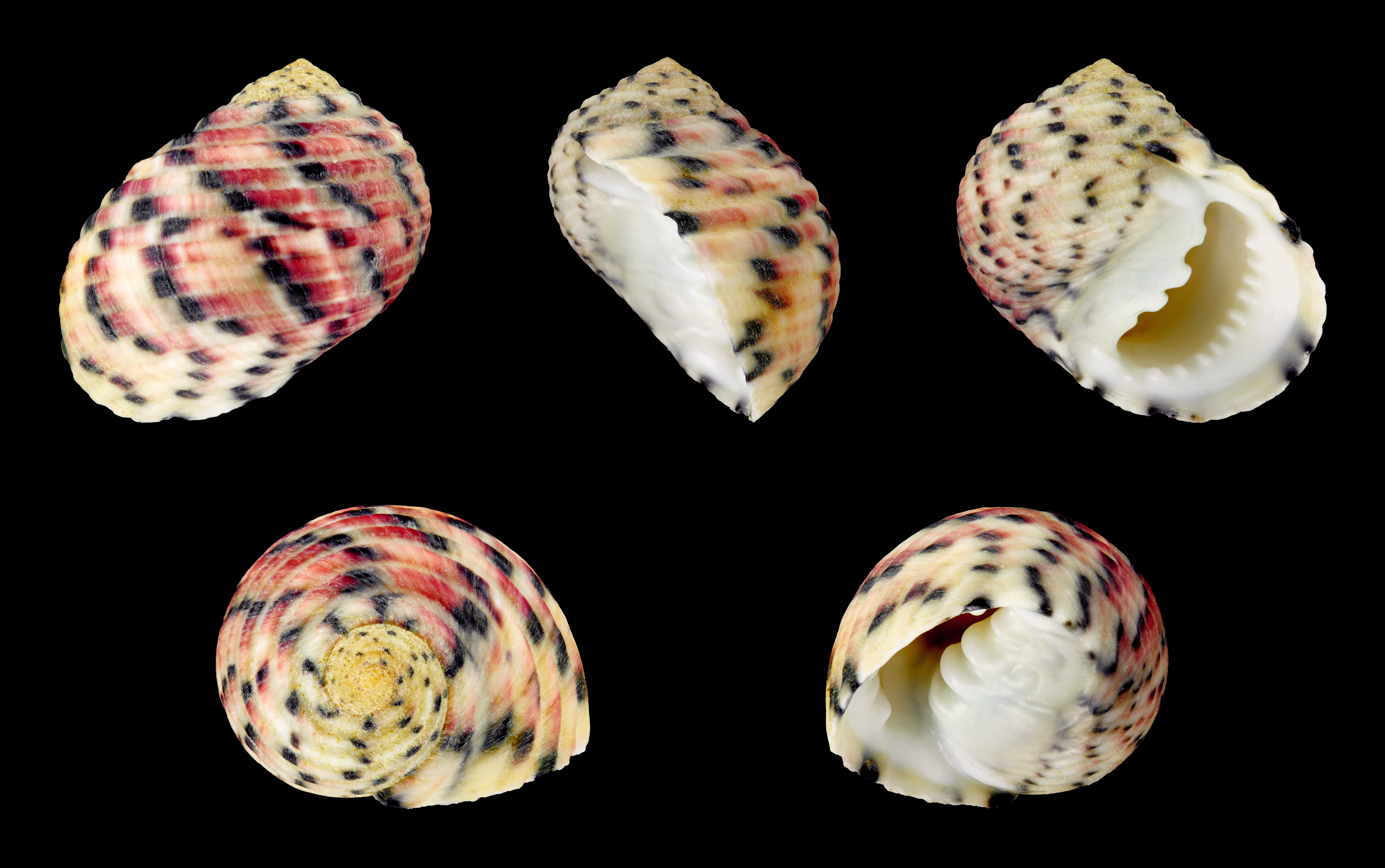

Scientific classification
- Kingdom: Animalia
- Phylum: Mollusca
- Class: Gastropoda
- Order: Cycloneritida
- Family: Neritidae
- Genus: Nerita
- Species: N. versicolor

Binomial name
- Nerita versicolor Gmelin, 1791

Synonyms
- Nerita (Nerita) versicolor Gmelin, 1791· accepted, alternate representation; Nerita (Ritena) versicolor Gmelin, 1791; Nerita amplisulcata Macsotay & Campos, 2001; Nerita flammea Gmelin, 1791; † Nerita hertweckorum Petuch, 1994; Nerita musica Röding, 1798; Nerita nigrocincta Nowell-Usticke, 1959; Nerita pica Gmelin, 1791; Nerita selot Récluz, 1850; Nerita tricolor Gmelin, 1791; Nerita variegata Mörch, 1852

= Nerita versicolor =

Species of gastropod

Nerita versicolor is a species of sea snail, a marine gastropod mollusk in the family Neritidae.

== Description ==
The maximum recorded shell length is 20.5 mm.

Shell small, consisting of 3 whorls and a smooth protoconch. The body whorl is large and flattened globose briefly, concave below the suture, sculptured with spiral cords 15–17 . The aperture is wide . The columella is lunate, with a straight edge and contains four teeth. The color of the shell is irregular with white, black and red or pink. The operculum is calcareous, slightly concave papillose and gray to brown externally

== Distribution ==
Widespread species in the Caribbean Sea. In Venezuela is noted for its coast, just as in Colombia

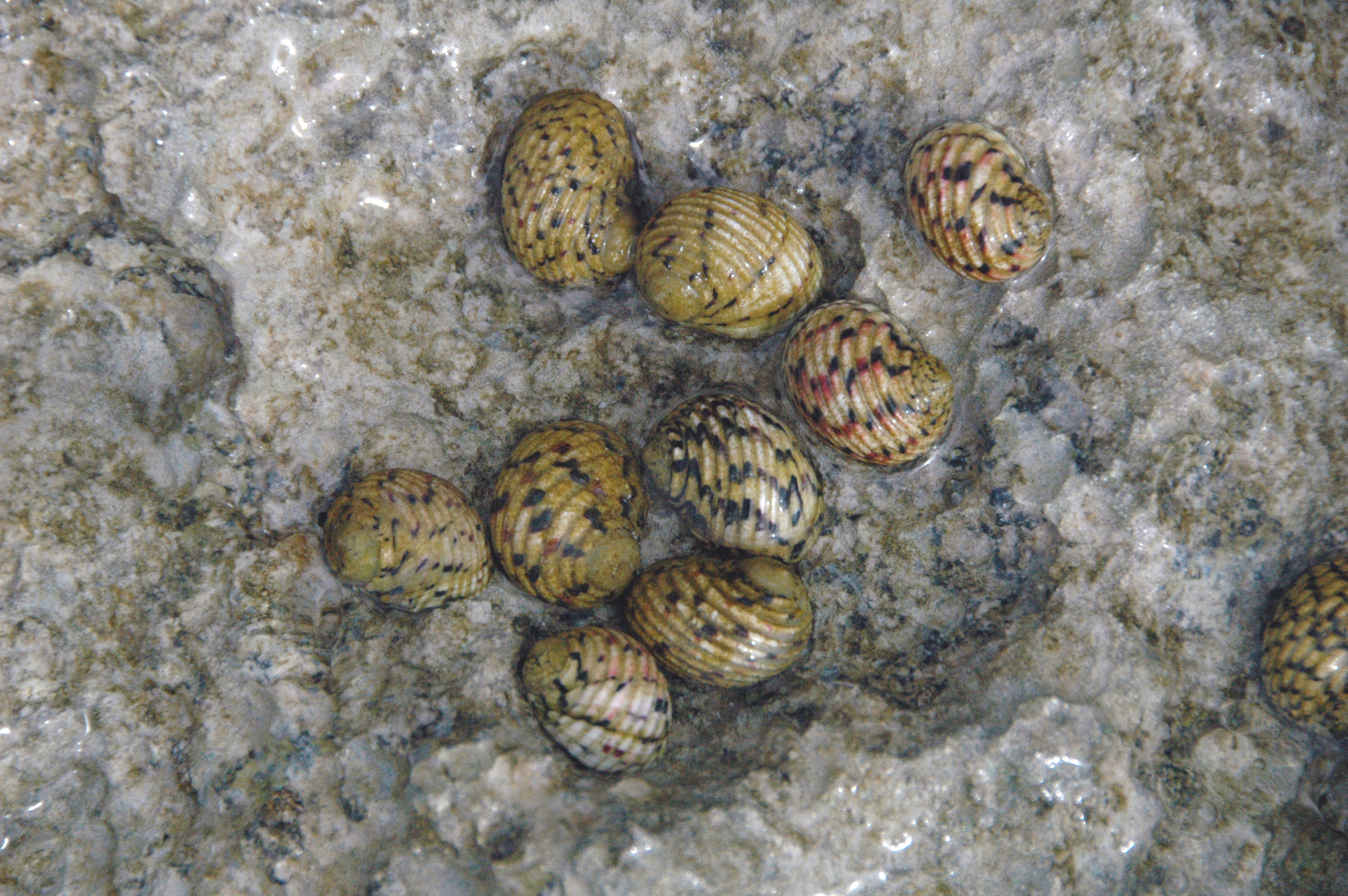
Nerita versicolor (four-toothed nerite snails), grazing in the intertidal zone. San Salvador Island, Bahamas
