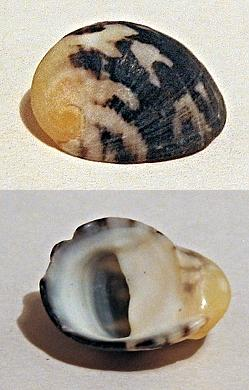
- Two views of a beachworn shell of Nerita orbignyana

Scientific classification
- Kingdom: Animalia
- Phylum: Mollusca
- Class: Gastropoda
- Order: Cycloneritida
- Family: Neritidae
- Genus: Nerita
- Species: N. orbignyana

Binomial name
- Nerita orbignyana Recluz, 1842

= Nerita orbignyana =

Species of gastropod

Nerita orbignyana is a species of sea snail with an operculum, a marine gastropod mollusk in the family Neritidae, the nerites. It was first described by César Auguste Récluz in 1842.
