= Nerita neritopsoides =

Scientific classification
- Kingdom: Animalia
- Phylum: Mollusca
- Class: Gastropoda
- Order: Cycloneritida
- Family: Neritidae
- Genus: Nerita
- Species: N. neritopsoides

Binomial name
- Nerita neritopsoides Reeve, 1855

Species of gastropod

Nerita neritopsoides is a species of sea snail, a marine gastropod mollusc in the family Neritidae.
