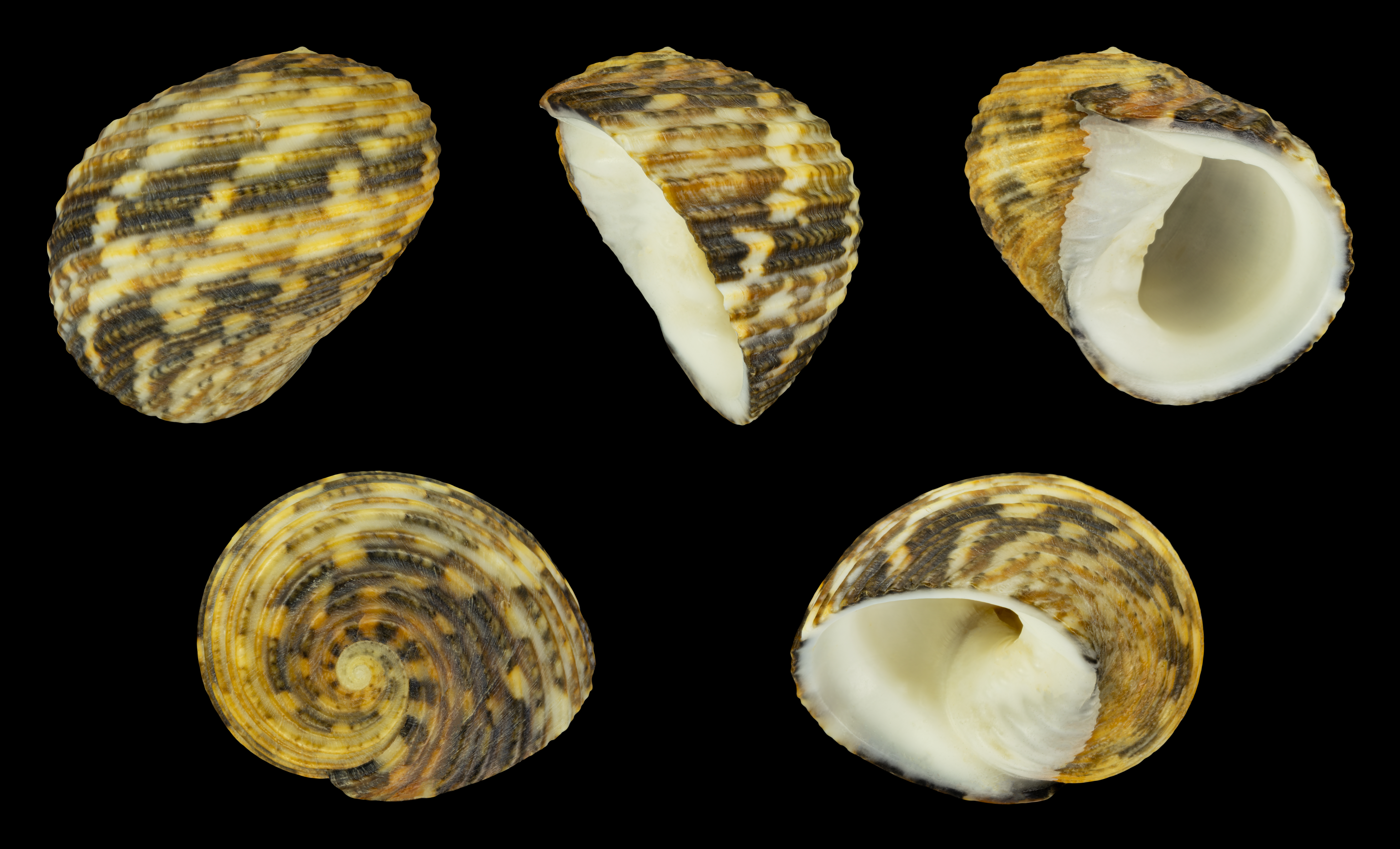
- Shell of Nerita chamaeleon

Scientific classification
- Kingdom: Animalia
- Phylum: Mollusca
- Class: Gastropoda
- Order: Cycloneritida
- Family: Neritidae
- Genus: Nerita
- Species: N. chamaeleon

Binomial name
- Nerita chamaeleon Linnaeus, 1758

= Nerita chamaeleon =

Species of gastropod

Nerita chamaeleon is a species of sea snail, a marine gastropod mollusk in the family Neritidae.

== Description ==
Their shell is smaller in size. It grows up to 25mm. They are colourful in nature and commonly seen in inter tidal rocky shore. They are active in night times.

== Distribution ==
This snail is found on rocks, breakwaters and seawall of Pulau Ubin, Changi, Tanah Merah, Marina South, Labrador, Sentosa, Pulau Bukom, St. John's Island, Pulau Hantu, Pulau Semakau, Pulau Salu, Tuas and Godavari region in India. Present too in southern Thailand(Andamane sea)
