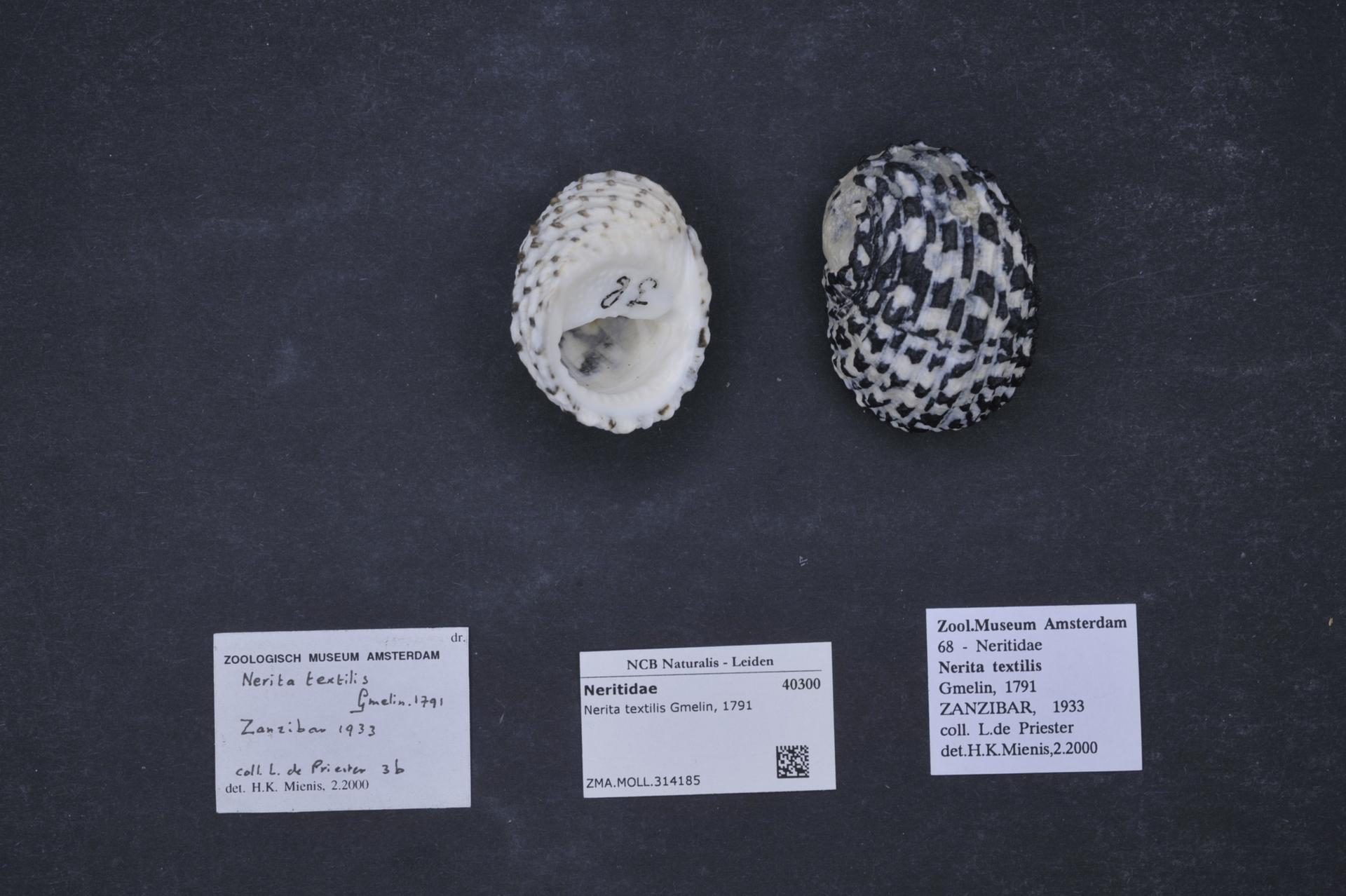

Scientific classification
- Kingdom: Animalia
- Phylum: Mollusca
- Class: Gastropoda
- Order: Cycloneritida
- Family: Neritidae
- Genus: Nerita
- Species: N. textilis

Binomial name
- Nerita textilis Gmelin, 1791

Synonyms
- Nerita plexa Dillwyn

= Nerita textilis =

Species of gastropod

Nerita textilis, common name the textile nerite, is a species of sea snail, a marine gastropod mollusk in the family Neritidae.

== Description ==
The shell grows to a length of 5 cm. Its surface texture shows broad, ridged, spiral cords. The thick operculum is granulose. The exterior is white with black spots that are widely spaced on the cords. The outer lip is thick and denticulate. Its colour is bluish-grey.

== Distribution ==
This species occurs on rocks in the littoral fringe of the Red Sea and in the Indo-Pacific off Aldabra, the east coast of South Africa, Kenya, Madagascar, the Mascarene basin, Mozambique and Tanzania.
