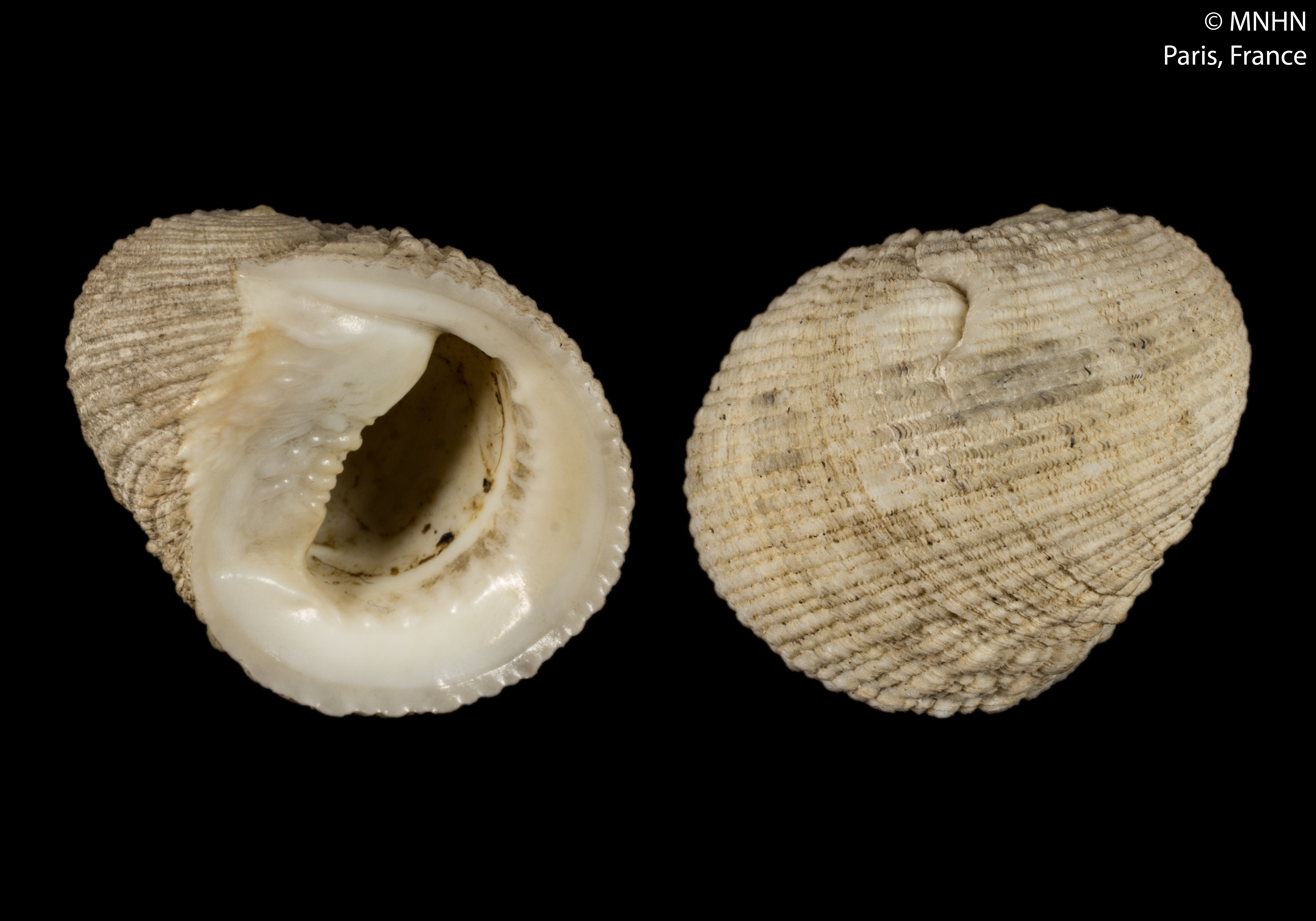

Scientific classification
- Kingdom: Animalia
- Phylum: Mollusca
- Class: Gastropoda
- Order: Cycloneritida
- Family: Neritidae
- Genus: Nerita
- Species: N. histrio

Binomial name
- Nerita histrio Linnaeus, 1758

= Nerita histrio =

Species of sea snails

Nerita histrio is a species of small to medium-sized sea snails. They are typically found in rocky structures in coastal areas. It has a thick and heavy shell, and a distinct shell color that varies across individuals.

== Distribution and habitat ==
This species can be found on rocky shores or any structures near the coast, and has been spotted the most times at Nai Yang Beach in Thailand.

== Description ==
Nerita histrio is characterized by a thick and heavy shell with spiraled grooves along the sides. It was first identified by Carl Linnaeus in 1758 in Systema Naturae. Their length ranges between 2 cm (0.79 in) and 4 cm (1.6 in). There is a protective operculum seal around the entrance of the shell.
