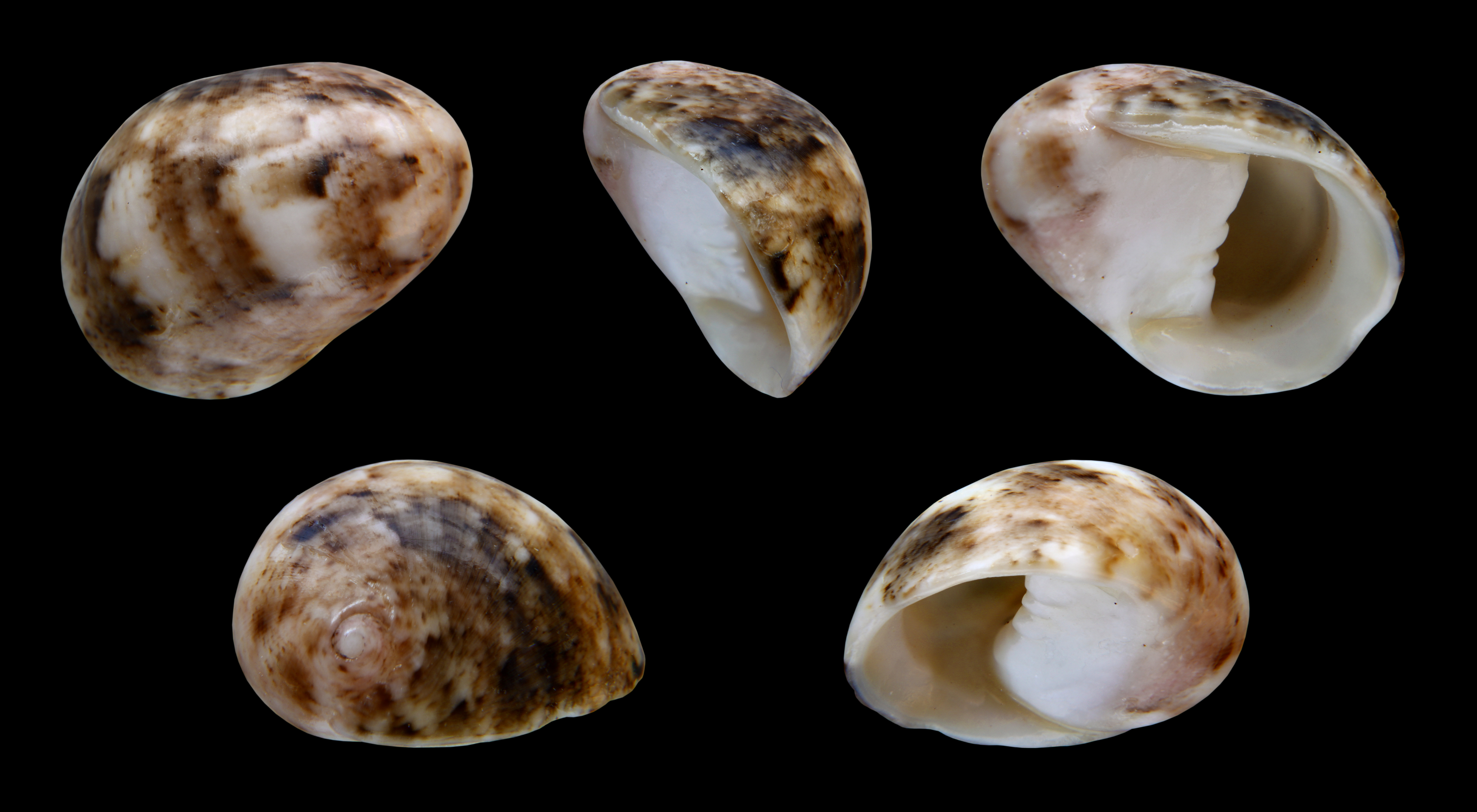
- Five views of a brown form shell of Nerita polita

Scientific classification
- Kingdom: Animalia
- Phylum: Mollusca
- Class: Gastropoda
- Order: Cycloneritida
- Family: Neritidae
- Genus: Nerita
- Species: N. polita

Binomial name
- Nerita polita Linnaeus, 1758

Synonyms
- Nerita (Linnerita) polita Linnaeus, 1758· accepted, alternate representation; Nerita arriaca Röding, 1798; Nerita bidens Linnaeus, 1758; Nerita bifasciata Gmelin, 1791; Nerita flava Mörch, 1852; Nerita flavescens Dillwyn, 1817; Nerita hieroglyphica Dillwyn, 1817; Nerita larva Gmelin, 1791; Nerita lineolata Gray, 1858; Nerita opaca Röding, 1798; Nerita picta Humphrey, 1797 (unavailable name: published in a work placed on the Official Index)

= Nerita polita =

Species of sea snail

Nerita polita is a species of sea snail, a marine gastropod mollusk in the family Neritidae, commonly known as polished nerite or kupe'e in Hawaiian. It is a marine snail that has the ability to provide significant resources such as proteins, vitamins, minerals. It is known as Golhaa in the Maldivian language.

== Description ==
Nerita polita has a distinctively smooth and polished shell that is up to 4 cm in size. It has a smooth columella with 2–4 weak teeth on the edge. The shellʻs color is variable: mottled grey, red or cream, sometimes with thin or thick axial bands or a chevron pattern with white and gray spirals. The operculum is smooth, and is cream to black in color. The inside of the shell is mostly white, with a tint of yellow, and no teeth.

Nerita polita is exposed to fresh sewage and heavy metals due to industrialization and urbanization.

== Distribution and habitat ==
Nerita polita is found in the tropical Indo-Pacific. It is mostly found in the intertidal, burrowing into the sand at the base of basalt formations and limestone near the shore. It can also be found on fine sandy shores and the littoral fringe of rocky shores. They tend to come out when the tide is low to reproduce and feed. When the tide begins to rise they head towards their resting spots.

Distribution of Nerita polita include:

- Aldabra
- Chagos
- East Coast of South Africa
- Kenya
- Madagascar
- Mascarene Basin
- Mauritius
- Mozambique
- Red Sea
- Tanzania
- Maldives

== Cultural significance ==
Kupe'e are used for decorations for hula dancing, specifically wrist and ankle adornments, other embellishments can be a neck lei, made from the snail's shell. This snail's presence holds value to the Hawaiian culture as it is a part of the hula performances. In hawaiʻi, it is also used for food. People in Hawai'i eat it in multiple different styles like raw and boiled.
