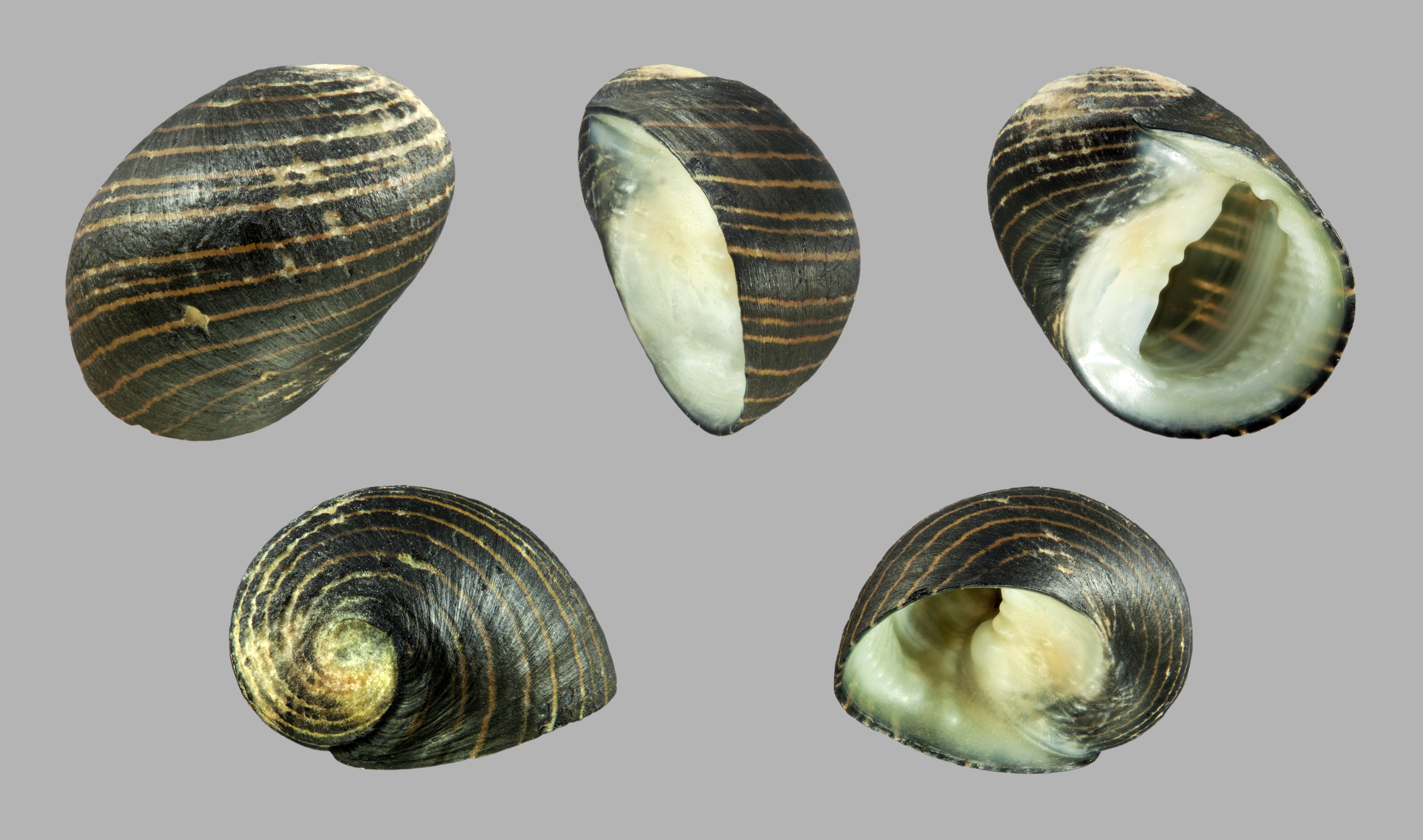

Scientific classification
- Kingdom: Animalia
- Phylum: Mollusca
- Class: Gastropoda
- Order: Cycloneritida
- Family: Neritidae
- Genus: Nerita
- Species: N. senegalensis

Binomial name
- Nerita senegalensis Gmelin, 1791

Synonyms
- Nerita (Theliostyla) senegalensis Gmelin, 1791· accepted, alternate representation; Nerita achatina Reeve, 1855; Nerita atrata Gmelin, 1791; Nerita atrata Chemnitz, 1781 (unavailable name: published in a work placed on the Official Index); Nerita dunar Récluz, 1850; Nerita largillierti Philippi, 1849; Nerita scalpta Reeve, 1855; Neritina fraseri Reeve, 1855

= Nerita senegalensis =

Species of gastropod

Nerita senegalensis is a species of sea snail, a marine gastropod mollusk in the family Neritidae.

== Description ==
The length of the shell attains 13 mm.

Nerita senegalensis is a marine gastropod that appears to have a preference for specific levels of the shore. According to some laboratory and field experiments, displaced snails exhibit a general 'homing' behavior when displaced down-shore or up shore. However, cues involved in this migrational behavior have yet to be identified.

== Distribution ==
This marine species occurs off Gabon and Senegal.
