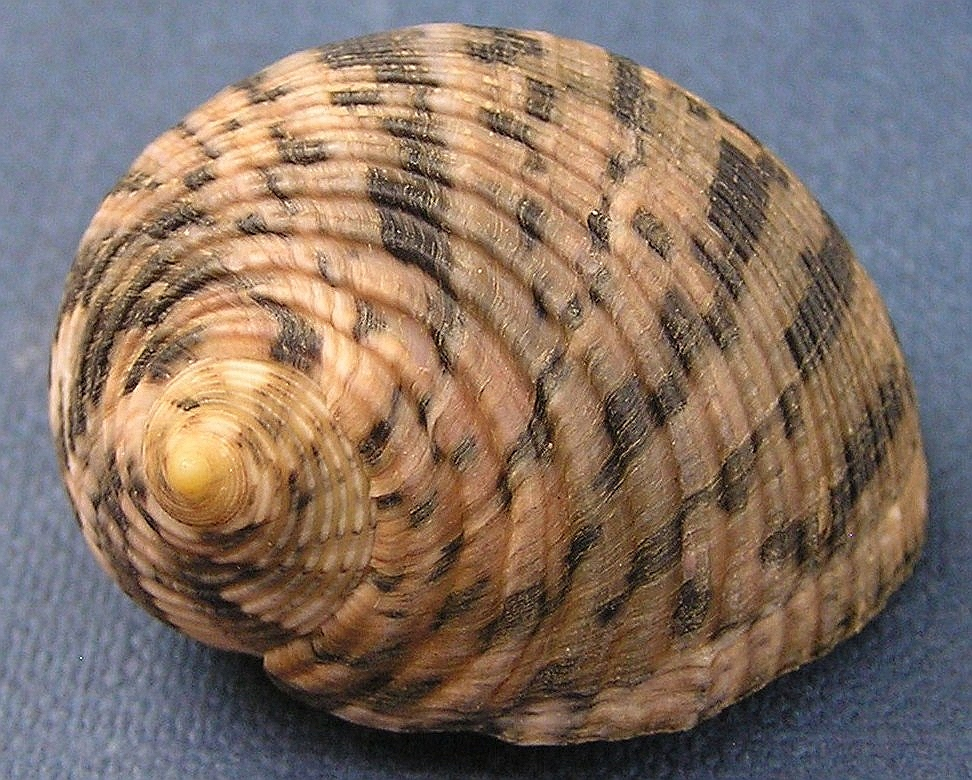
- Nerita aterrima

Scientific classification
- Kingdom: Animalia
- Phylum: Mollusca
- Class: Gastropoda
- Order: Cycloneritida
- Family: Neritidae
- Genus: Nerita
- Species: N. aterrima

Binomial name
- Nerita aterrima Gmelin, 1791

Synonyms
- Nerita (Argonerita) aterrima Gmelin, 1791· accepted, alternate representation; Nerita commanotata Reeve, 1855; Nerita mascareignarum Récluz, 1850; Nerita mascarenharum Récluz, 1842; Nerita mauritiae Récluz, 1841 (invalid: junior homonym of Nerita mauritiae Lesson, 1831; N. mascarenharum is a replacement name); Nerita punctata Quoy & Gaimard, 1834 (invalid: junior homonym of Nerita punctata O.F. Müller, 1774, and several others)

= Nerita aterrima =

Species of gastropod

Nerita aterrima is a species of sea snail, a marine gastropod mollusk in the family Neritidae.

== Description ==
The shell grows to a length of 27 mm.

== Distribution ==
This species occurs in the Pacific Ocean off the Philippines and Western Australia.
