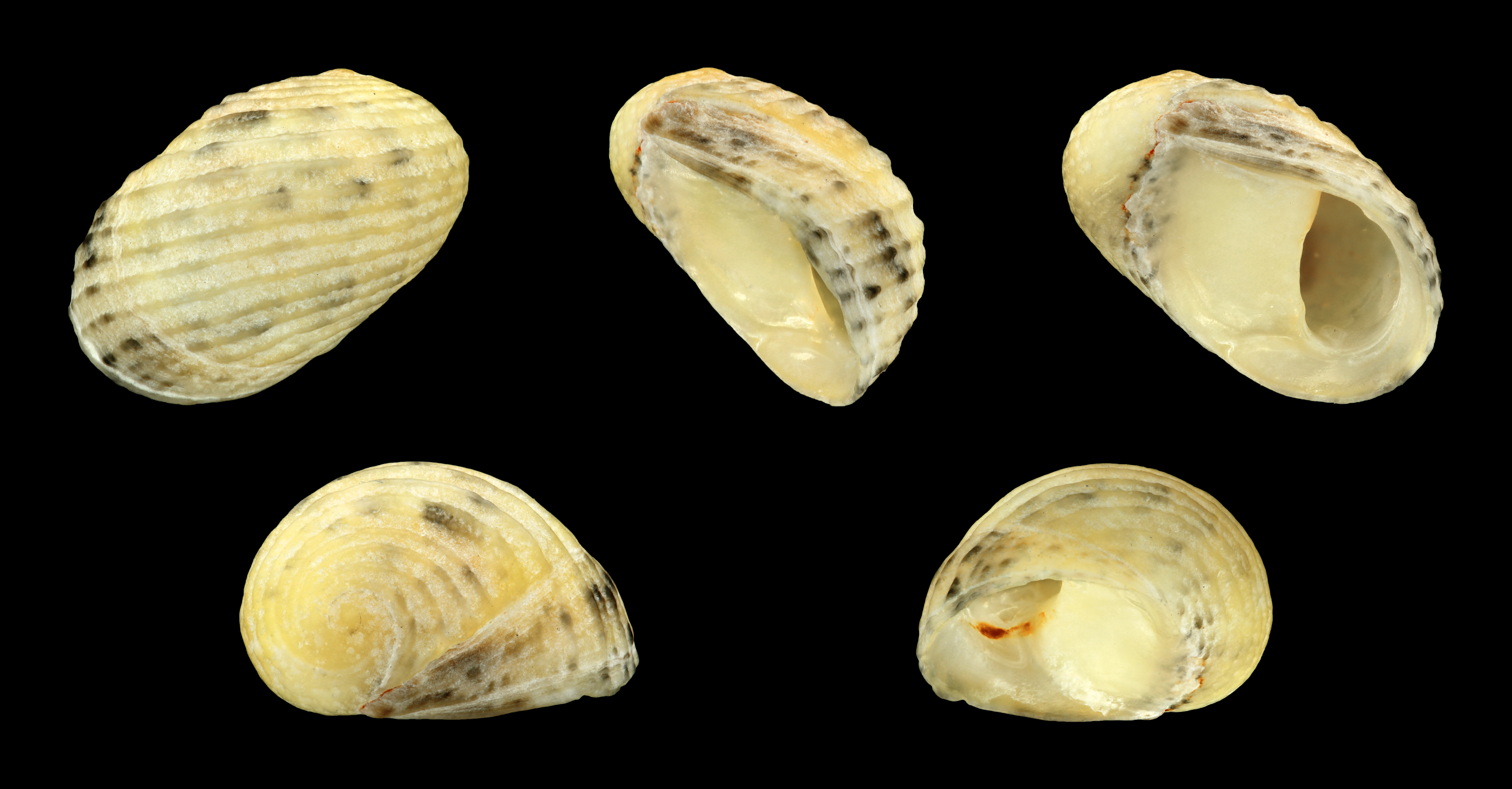

Scientific classification
- Kingdom: Animalia
- Phylum: Mollusca
- Class: Gastropoda
- Order: Cycloneritida
- Family: Neritidae
- Genus: Nerita
- Species: N. insculpta

Binomial name
- Nerita insculpta Récluz, 1841

= Nerita insculpta =

Species of gastropod

Nerita insculpta is a species of sea snail, a marine gastropod mollusk in the family Neritidae.
