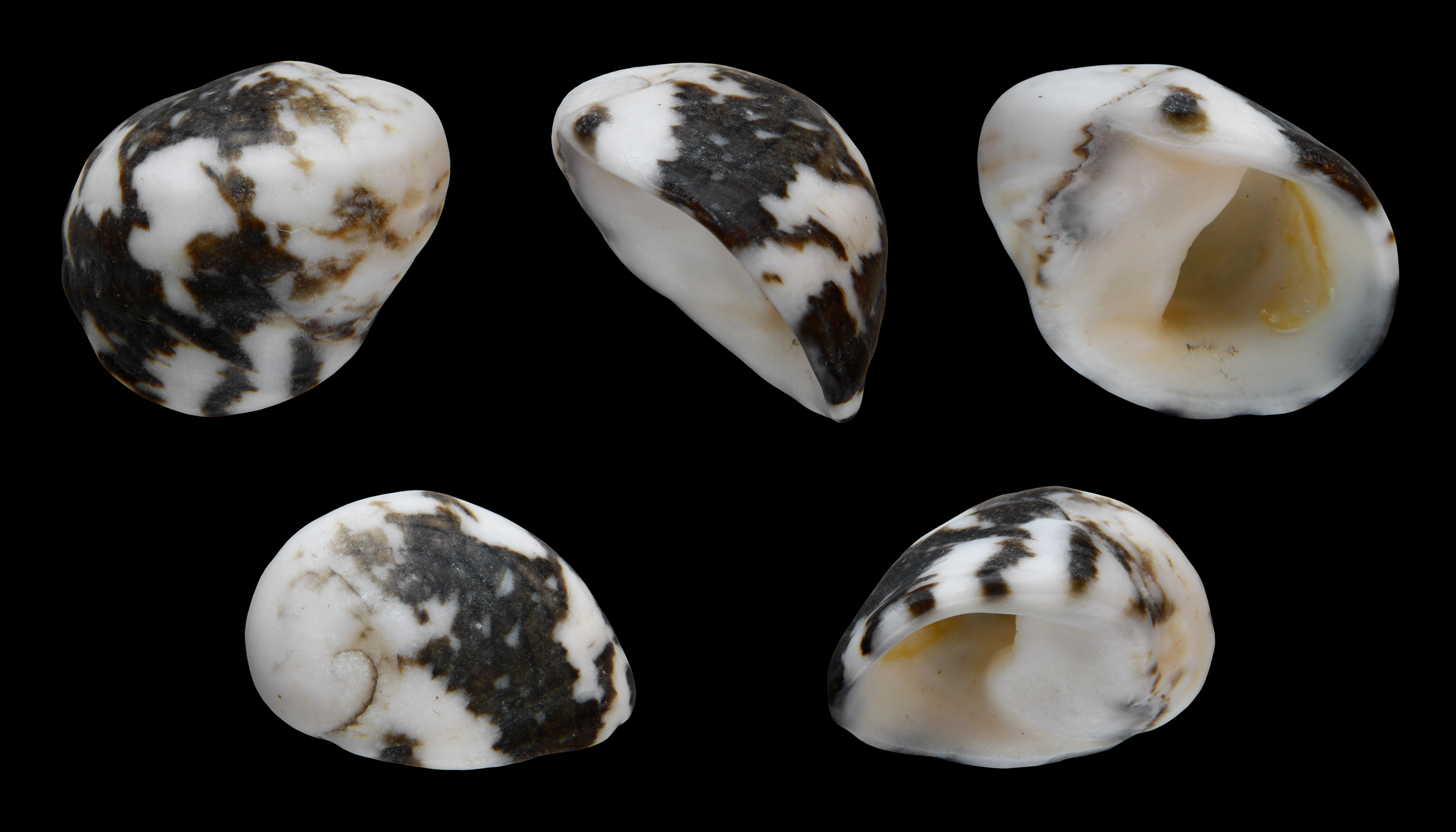
- Five views of a shell of Nerita sanguinolenta

Scientific classification
- Kingdom: Animalia
- Phylum: Mollusca
- Class: Gastropoda
- Order: Cycloneritida
- Family: Neritidae
- Genus: Nerita
- Species: N. sanguinolenta

Binomial name
- Nerita sanguinolenta Menke, 1829

Synonyms
- Nerita (Theliostyla) sanguinolenta Menke, 1829· accepted, alternate representation; Nerita crassilabra Smith E.A., 1885; Nerita crassilabrum E. A. Smith, 1885; Nerita erythrea Récluz, 1850; Nerita forskaelii Récluz, 1841; Nerita marginata var. coccinea Mörch, 1852; Nerita marmorata Reeve, 1855 (Invalid: junior homonym of Nerita marmorata Link, 1807; N. crassilabrum E.A. Smith, 1885 is a replacement name); † Nerita plexa var. multistriata Abrard, 1942; Neritina kinzelbachi F. Nordsieck, 1973

= Nerita sanguinolenta =

Species of gastropod

Nerita sanguinolenta is a species of sea snail, a marine gastropod mollusk in the family Neritidae.
