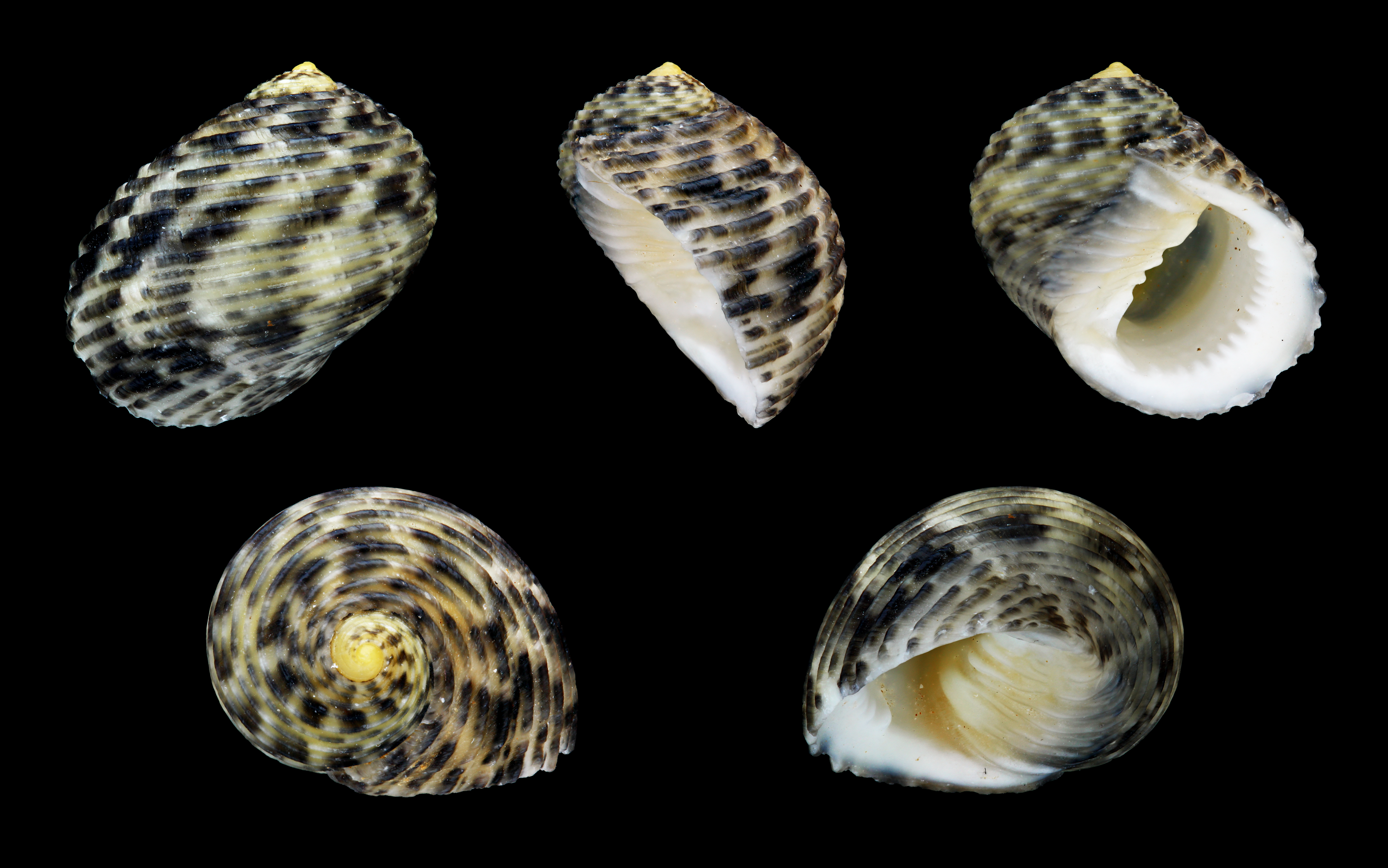
- Five views of a shell of Nerita undata Linné, 1758

Scientific classification
- Kingdom: Animalia
- Phylum: Mollusca
- Class: Gastropoda
- Order: Cycloneritida
- Family: Neritidae
- Genus: Nerita
- Species: N. undata

Binomial name
- Nerita undata Linnaeus, 1758

Synonyms
- Nerita (Cymostyla) crassa Gould, 1852· accepted, alternate representation; Nerita (Cymostyla) undata Linnaeus, 1758· accepted, alternate representation; Nerita crassa Gould, 1852; Nerita leguillouana Récluz, 1842; Nerita marmorata Hombron & Jacquinot, 1848 (invalid: junior homonym of N. marmorata Meuschen, 1787 and N. marmorata Link, 1807); Nerita proxima G. B. Sowerby III, 1903; Ritena undata (Linnaeus, 1758)

= Nerita undata =

Species of gastropod

Nerita undata is a species of sea snail, a marine gastropod mollusk in the family Neritidae.

Synonyms

- Nerita undata quadricolor Gmelin, 1791: synonym of Nerita quadricolor Gmelin, 1791
- Nerita undata var. micronesica E. von Martens, 1887: synonym of Nerita maura Récluz, 1842 (junior synonym)

== Description ==
Habitat: rocky cliffs (Ruwa, 1984 <109>). Up to 4 cm, with radial ridges on the shell surface; columella with three teeth. Pale in colour with variable darker markings, sometimes uniformly bluish-black, pale interior.

== Distribution ==
This marine species occurs in the Indo-Pacific. (Richmond, 1997) and off Papua New Guinea.

Habitat: littoral fringe rocks.
