= Nerita striata =

Scientific classification
- Kingdom: Animalia
- Phylum: Mollusca
- Class: Gastropoda
- Order: Cycloneritida
- Family: Neritidae
- Genus: Nerita
- Species: N. striata

Binomial name
- Nerita striata Récluz, 1841

Synonyms
- Nerita (Cymostyla) striata Burrow, 1815· accepted, alternate representation; Nerita aurantia Récluz, 1842; Nerita chrysostoma Récluz, 1841; Nerita icterina Küster, 1863

Species of gastropod

Nerita striata is a species of sea snail, a marine gastropod mollusk in the family Neritidae.
