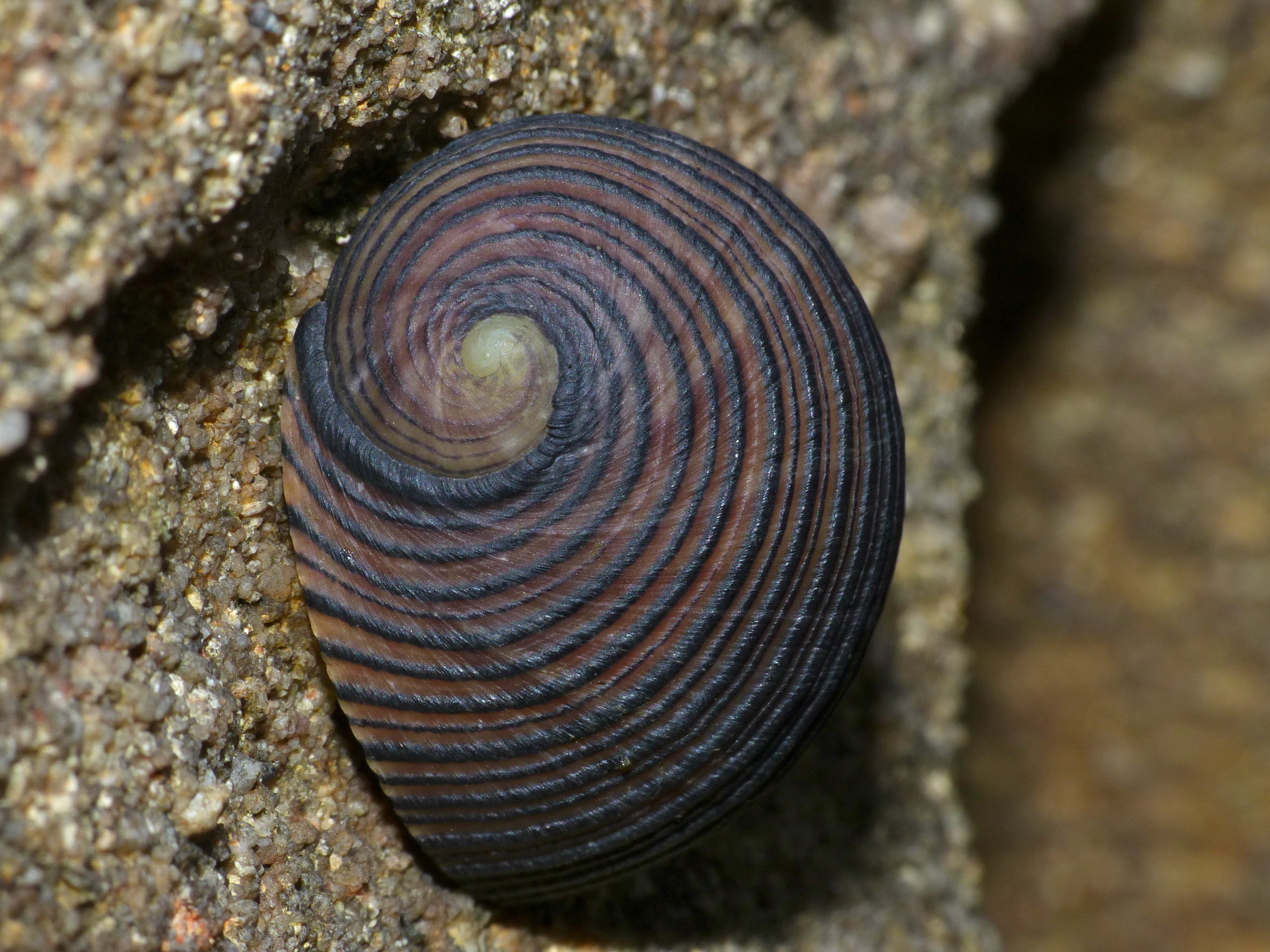
- Nerita balteata

Scientific classification
- Kingdom: Animalia
- Phylum: Mollusca
- Class: Gastropoda
- Order: Cycloneritida
- Family: Neritidae
- Genus: Nerita
- Species: N. balteata

Binomial name
- Nerita balteata Reeve, 1855

Synonyms
- Nerita (Amphinerita) articulata Gould, 1847 (junior synonym); Nerita (Cymostyla) balteata Reeve, 1855 accepted, alternate representation; Nerita (Nerita) articulata A. Gould, 1847 (nomen dubium); Nerita (Pila) birmanica Troschel, 1878 (a junior synonym); Nerita articulata A. Gould, 1847; Nerita lineata Gmelin, 1791 (non Müller, 1774)

= Nerita balteata =

Species of gastropod

Nerita balteata is a species of sea snail, a marine gastropod mollusk in the family Neritidae.

== Description ==
The length of the shell is 11.5-33.8 mm.

== Distribution ==
Peninsular Malaysia

== Habitat ==
Mangrove forests.

This species can be used as bioindicator of heavy metals in its environment, because it accumulates cadmium, nickel and lead in its shell and copper, zinc and iron in its soft tissues.
