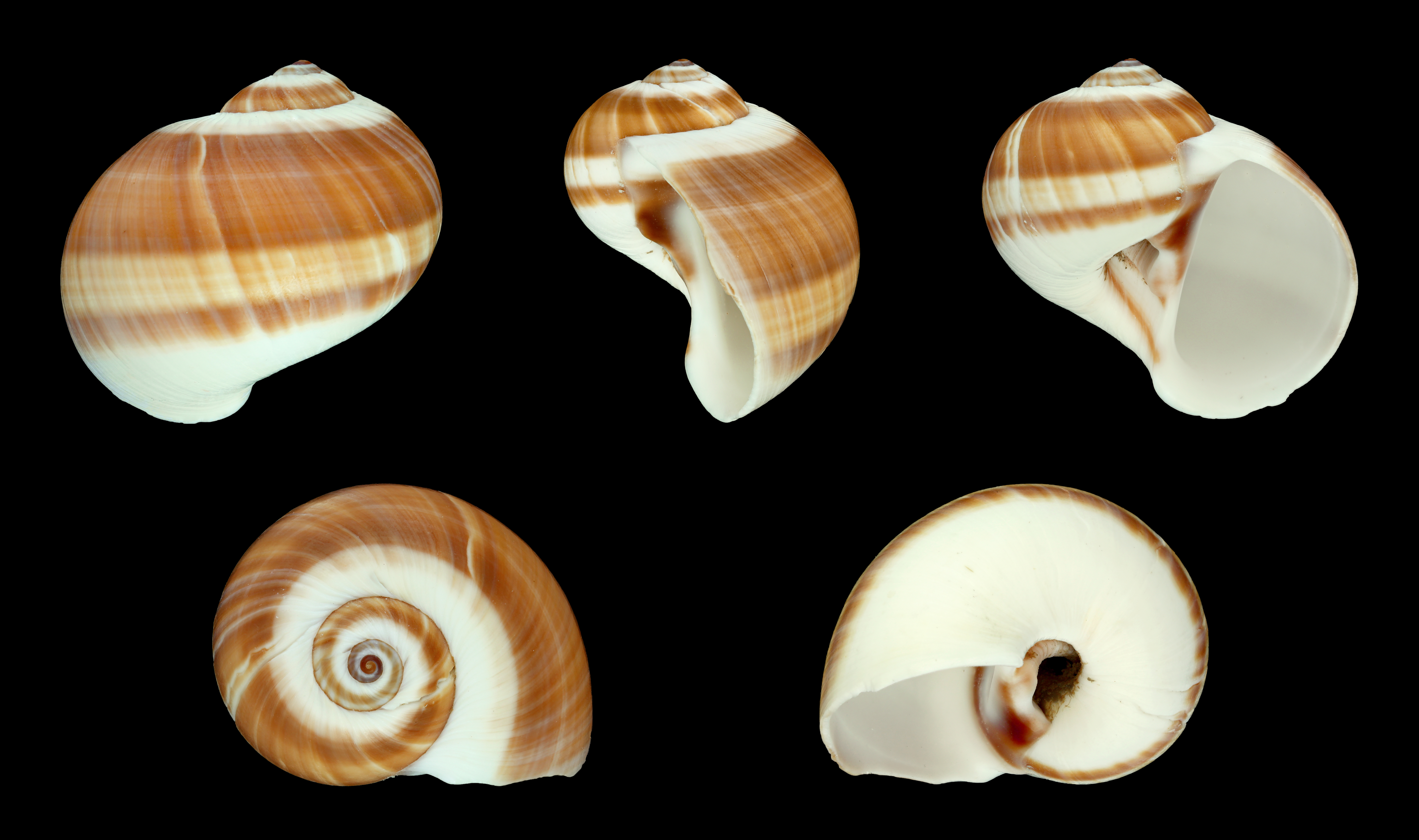
- Five views of a shell of Natica vitellus

Scientific classification
- Kingdom: Animalia
- Phylum: Mollusca
- Class: Gastropoda
- Subclass: Caenogastropoda
- Order: Littorinimorpha
- Family: Naticidae
- Genus: Natica
- Species: N. vitellus

Binomial name
- Natica vitellus (Linnaeus, 1758)

Synonyms
- Natica ponsonbyi Melvill, 1899; Natica ponsonbyi var. azona Melvill, 1928; Natica rufa (Born, 1778); Nerita leucozonias Gmelin, 1791; Nerita rufa Born, 1778; Nerita vitellus Linnaeus, 1758 (original combination)

= Natica vitellus =

Species of gastropod

Natica vittellus is a species of predatory sea snail, a marine gastropod mollusk in the family Naticidae, the moon snails.

== Description ==
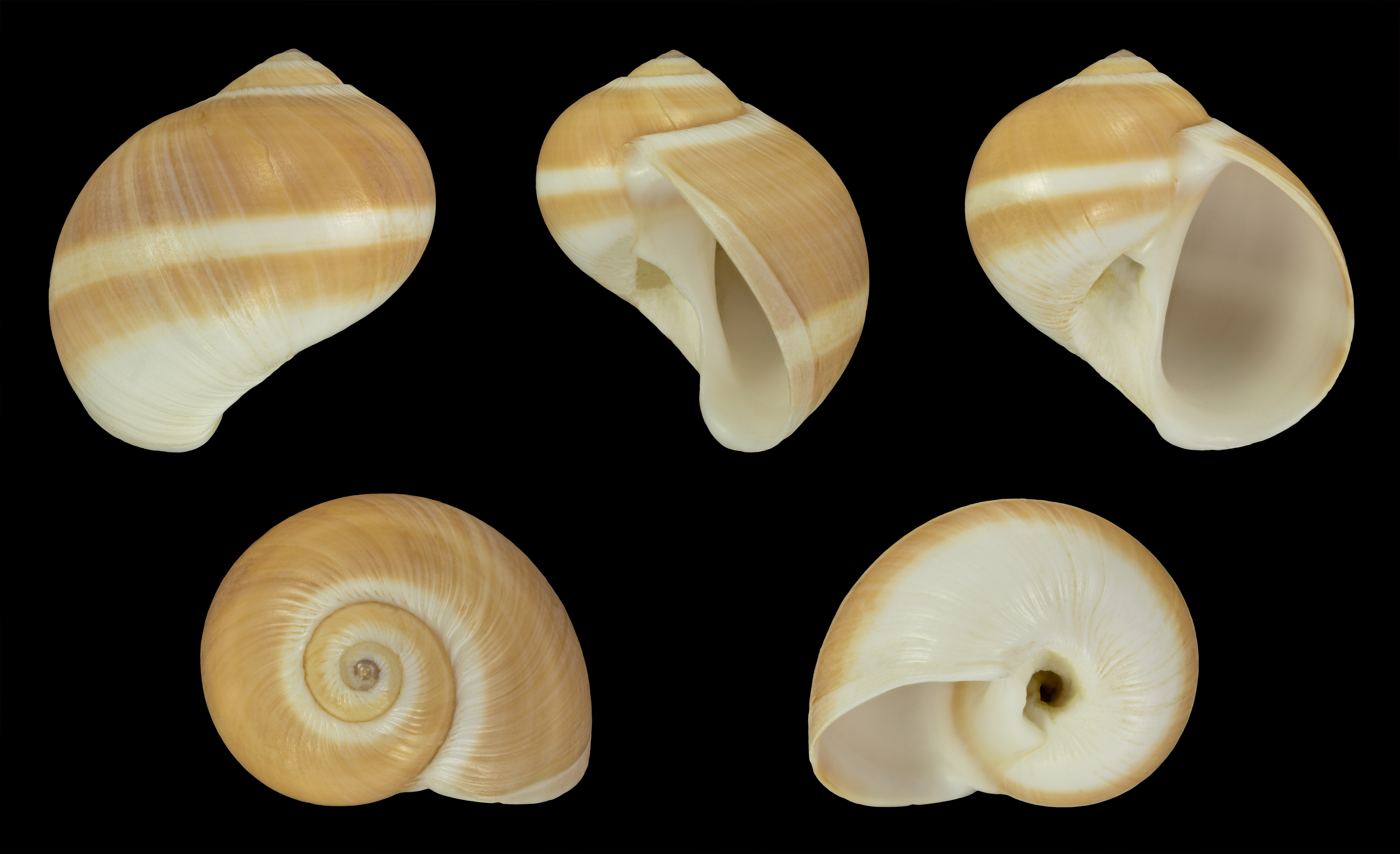
var. rufa

The shell is moderately large, measuring 25–45 mm in height, and is solidly constructed with a low spire. Its surface is generally smooth, apart from fine growth striae, which tend to be more pronounced along the suture and on the early whorls. The shell exhibits considerable variation in coloration. Some specimens are predominantly white, bearing a single broad brown band on the body whorl, whereas others are mainly brown, with the lower half of the body whorl, a central band, and an area adjacent to the suture remaining white. The whorls of the protoconch are characteristically purplish-brown.

The aperture is wide and semi-ovate, white in colour, and marked internally with brown pigmentation. The parietal callus is thick but narrow, extending only partially across the posterior portion of the umbilicus. The funicle is poorly defined and often merges with the umbilical wall, while the umbilicus itself remains open and deep.

The operculum is calcareous and white. Its columellar edge is distinctly serrated, whereas the labial edge bears two marginal ribs. The nucleus terminates in a somewhat callous knob, giving the operculum a characteristic appearance.

== Distribution ==
This species occurs in the Indian Ocean off Madagascar and in the West Pacific; also off Australia (Northern Territory, Queensland, Western Australia)
