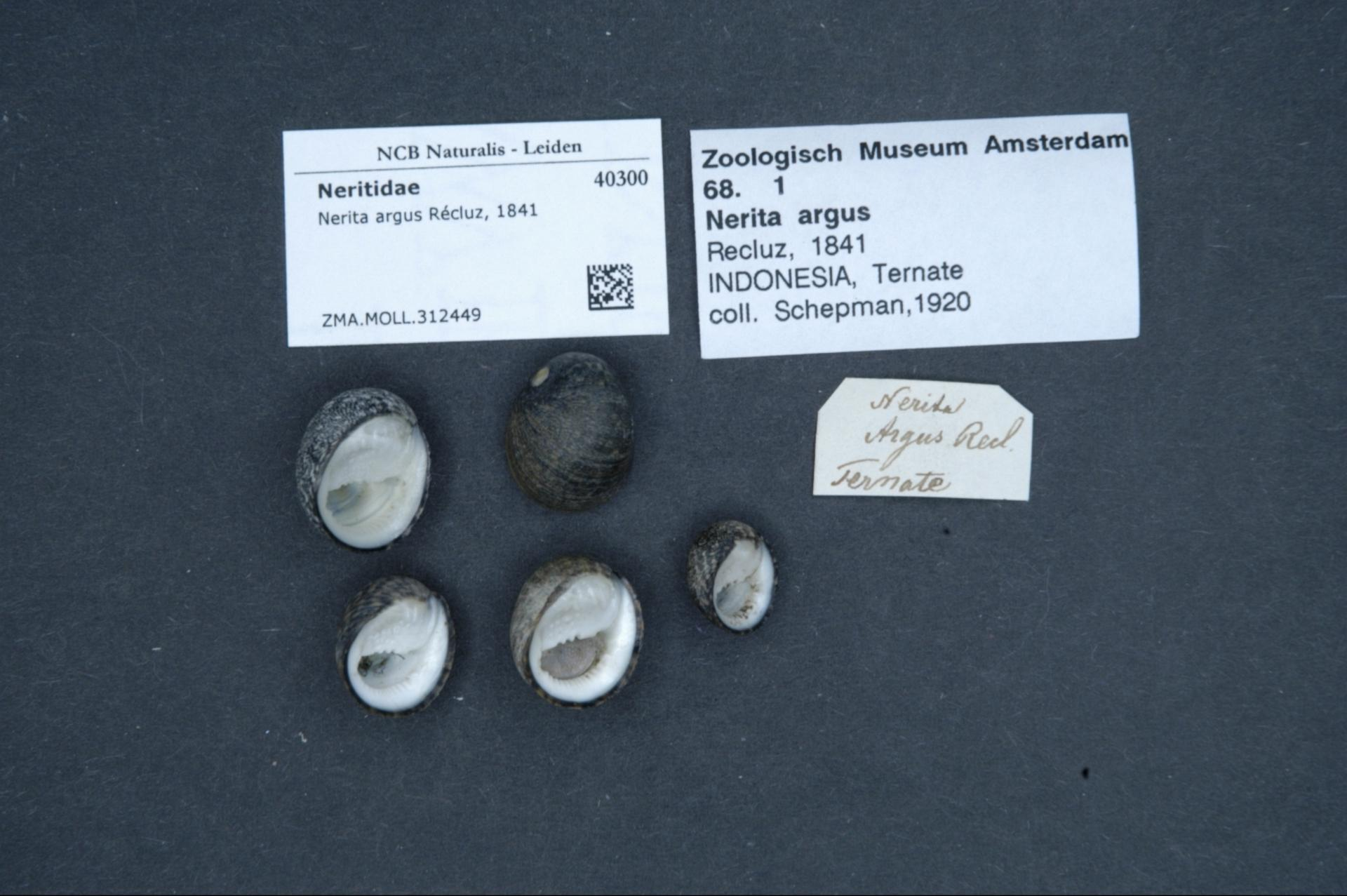

Scientific classification
- Kingdom: Animalia
- Phylum: Mollusca
- Class: Gastropoda
- Order: Cycloneritida
- Family: Neritidae
- Genus: Nerita
- Species: N. argus

Binomial name
- Nerita argus Récluz, 1841

Synonyms
- Nerita maculata Pease, 1867; Nerita schmeltziana Dunker, 1869

= Nerita argus =

Species of gastropod

Nerita argus is a species of sea snail. It is a marine gastropod mollusk in the family Neritidae.
