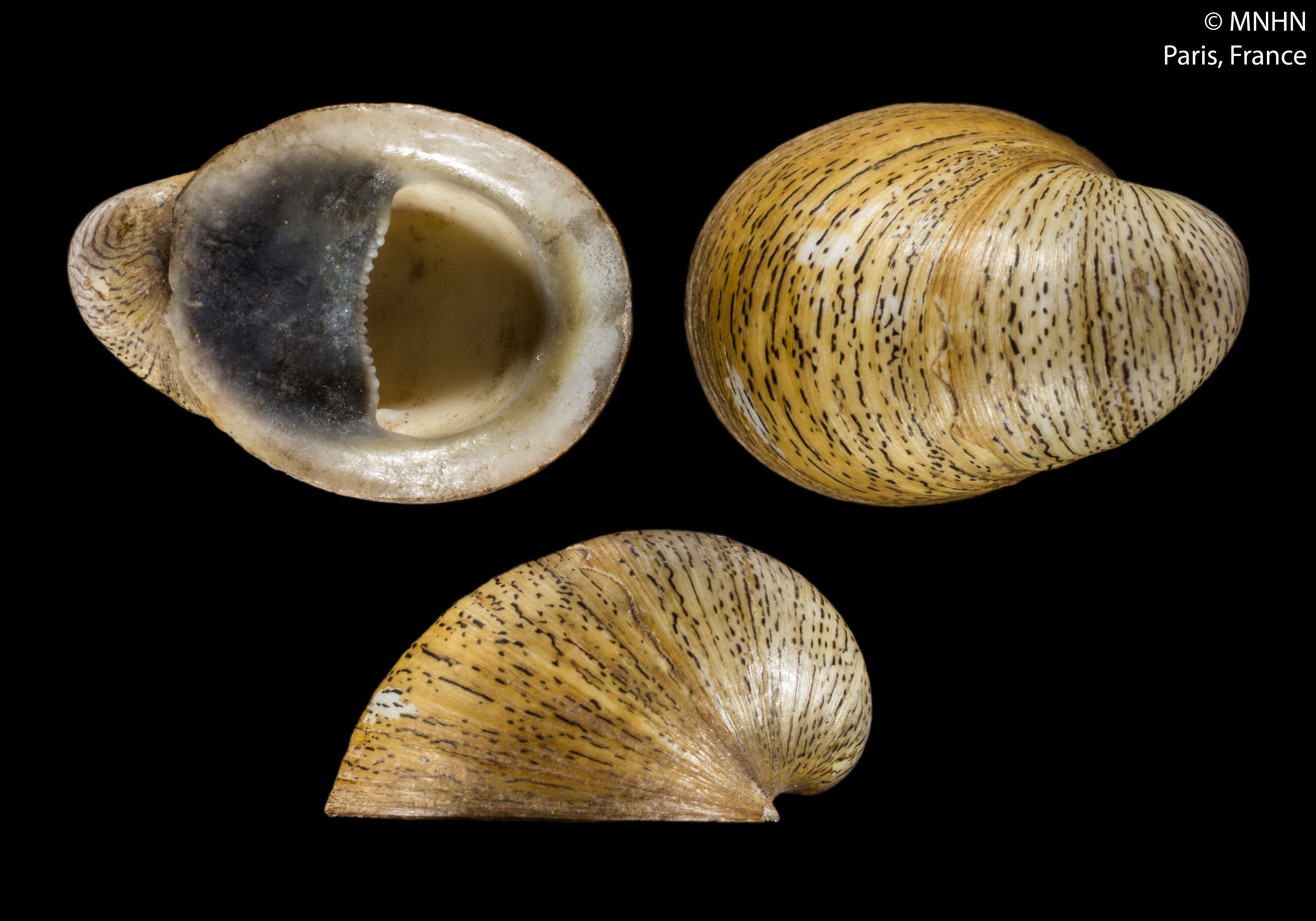
- Neripteron cornucopia shells (syntype at MNHN, Paris)

Scientific classification
- Kingdom: Animalia
- Phylum: Mollusca
- Class: Gastropoda
- Order: Cycloneritida
- Family: Neritidae
- Genus: Neripteron
- Species: N. cornucopia

Binomial name
- Neripteron cornucopia (Benson, 1836)

Synonyms
- Neripteron (Dostia) cornucopia (Benson, 1836); Nerita indica Souleyet, 1842; Neritina (Dostia) cornucopia Benson, 1836; Neritina aciculata Reeve, 1855; Neritina cornucopia Benson, 1836; Neritina melanostoma Troschel, 1837

= Neripteron cornucopia =

Species of gastropod

Neripteron cornucopia is a species of freshwater snail, an aquatic gastropod mollusk in the family Neritidae, the nerites.

== Distribution ==
Distribution of Neripteron cornucopia include Odisha state and West Bengal in India, Myanmar, Vietnam, Mai Po Marshes Nature reserve in Hong Kong, Singapore Jambi province in Indonesia, and Japan. Records from Japan were incorrectly identified as Neripteron violaceum prior to 1997.

The type locality is "Hugli estuary at Fort William and Tolly’s Nullah", now in Kolkata. William Thomas Blanford also reported this species from Irrawaddy River delta from Bago, Myanmar in 1867. It was rediscovered from India after 180 years in 2017.

== Description ==
Neripteron cornucopia was originally described under the name Neritina cornucopia by William Henry Benson in 1836. Benson's original text (the type description) in Latin and English reads as follows:

Neritina cornucopia. Testâ solidiusculâ, convolutâ, subsymetricâ,

transversèe ovato-acutâ, gibbosâ, pallide virente, punctis minimis nigris, interdum confluentibus, lineis longitudinalibus dispositis ornatâ; sporâ valdè depressâ; anfractu pone callum compresso, sub-mediano, minimè obliquo; peritremate acuto, libero, ovato, pene totam testam circumcludente; callo magno ingrescente; aperturâ lunatâ mediocri; labio recto totâ longitudine denticulato, medio emarginato.

Greatest transverse breadth 0.7 inch. At the first glance this shell would probably be mistaken for the last described species, from which it differs more especially in the greater proportionate size of the aperture, in the perfect parallelism of the inner lip with the axis of the shell, its denticulation nearly throughout its whole length, instead of merely in the centre; in the compression of the whorl at the back of the callus, and its subcentrical position, thereby occasioning the approach of the shell to a symmetrical configuration, and finally in its suite of colours. It is much less frequent than N. depressa. I have met with only two specimens, in the Hugli at Fort William, and in Tolly's Nullah, adhering to piles and bricks. The aperture is livid white, with blackish shades. The operculum, following the form

of the aperture, is broader than in N. depressa, and its two costate teeth are more developed.

The color of the live snail is black or dark grayish with black outline.

The color of the shell is dark brown. The coloration has also purplish and greenish spiral bands. Algae or silt are on periostracum usually.

The width of the shell is 10–13 mm in India, 7.2-12.9 mm in Hong Kong, and 6–17 mm in Singapore. The height of the shell is 4.5-9.2 mm in Hong Kong. The length of the shell is 13-19.6 mm in India, up to 17.4 mm in Hong Kong, and 9–24 mm in Singapore.

The operculum has paucispiral nucleus with a small initial region.

The Radula was described and depicted by Huang in 1997.

There is X0 sex-determination system in Neripteron cornucopia: the diploid number of chromosomes (2n) is 27 in males and 28 in females (2n = 26 + XX (or XO)).

Neripteron violaceum (synonym: Neritina depressa) is similar species. Neripteron auriculatum is very similar to juveniles of Neripteron cornucopia.

== Ecology ==
Neripteron cornucopia lives in intertidal mangroves. For example, Blanford collected them on stems of nipa palm Nypa fruticans. It lives in water on various substrates: on mud, on fallen leaves, on stones and under stones, on concrete.
