= Black nerite =

Two species of nerite snail

Black nerite may refer to either of the following species of Nerita:

- Nerita atramentosa
- Nerita melanotragus
