= Zebra nerite =

Zebra nerite may refer to several species of nerite snails in the aquarium trade with striped shells, including:

- Vittina natalensis, also known as spotted nerite, native to the coastal plain of East Africa
- Vittina waigiensis, also known as the red racer nerites or gold racer nerites, native to the Philippines and parts of Indonesia
- Vitta zebra, native to northeastern coastline of South America and nearby islands in the Caribbean
- Puperita pupa, native to the Caribbean and the Gulf of Mexico
