= Turton =

Turton may refer to:

== People ==
- Turton baronets

=== Surname ===
- Andrew Turton (1938–2021), British anthropologist
- Ashley Turton (1973–2011), American lobbyist and political staffer
- Chad Turton (born 1974), birth name of Chad Kroeger
- Cyril Turton (1921–2000), English football centre back
- Sir Edmund Turton, 1st Baronet of Upsall, York (1857–1929), British Conservative Party politician for Thirsk and Malton 1915–1929
- Edmund Turton (athlete) (born 1932), Olympic athlete from Trinidad and Tobago
- Enid Bakewell (née Turton; born 1940), played for the English women's cricket team
- Geoff Turton (born 1944), British singer
- Gibson Turton (1841–1891), New Zealand barrister and cricket player
- Gerald Turton, owner of Upsall Castle
- Harriet Bridgeman, Viscountess Bridgeman (née Victoria Harriet Lucy Turton; born 1942), founder of the Bridgeman Art Library
- Henry Hanson Turton (1818–1887), Member of Parliament in Taranaki, New Zealand
- Henry Turton (1832–1881), chess problem composer; see Turton doubling
- John Turton (1735–1806), English physician who treated King George III of Great Britain during the king's bouts of madness
- Kett Turton (Birkett Kealy Turton; born 1982), Canadian television and film actor
- Ollie Turton (born 1992), English football defender
- Major Richard Turton, British colonial military officer who re-established the convict settlement at Norfolk Island
- Robin Turton, Baron Tranmire (1903–1994), Life Peer and British Conservative Party politician for Thirsk and Malton
- Searle Turton (born 1979), Canadian politician
- Sue Turton (born c. 1966), British television journalist
- Stuart Turton, author of the 2018 novel The Seven Deaths of Evelyn Hardcastle
- Sir Thomas Turton, 1st Baronet of Starborough Castle, Surrey (1764–1844), MP for Southwark
- Thomas Turton DD (1780–1864), English academic and divine, the Bishop of Ely
- Sir Thomas Edward Michell Turton, 2nd Baronet of Starborough Castle, Surrey (1790–1854); see Turton baronets
- William Turton (1762–1835), British naturalist

== Places ==
=== Australia ===
- Point Turton, South Australia

=== United Kingdom ===
- Turton, Lancashire, a historical area, township and former civil parish now partly in Greater Manchester
  - Turton Urban District, a former urban district in Lancashire
  - North Turton, a civil parish of the Unitary Authority of Blackburn with Darwen in Lancashire
  - South Turton, an unparished area of the Metropolitan Borough of Bolton, in Greater Manchester
- Turton and Edgworth railway station, formerly on what is now the Northern Rail 'Ribble Valley Line
- Turton and Entwistle Reservoir, a water reservoir in the town of Edgworth, Lancashire
- Turton Tower, Chapeltown, Lancashire, a 15th-century manor house

=== United States ===
- Turton, South Dakota

== Organisations ==
- Turton F.C., a football club based in Edgworth, Lancashire, England
- Turton High School (1915–1956), a secondary school in Turton, South Dakota, U.S.
- Turton School, a mixed comprehensive secondary school and sixth form in Bromley Cross, in the Metropolitan Borough of Bolton

== Other uses ==
- Turton doubling, a manoeuvre found in chess problems
- Turton River, Victoria, Australia
- Sir Basil and Lady Turton, characters in the British television series Tales of the Unexpected
