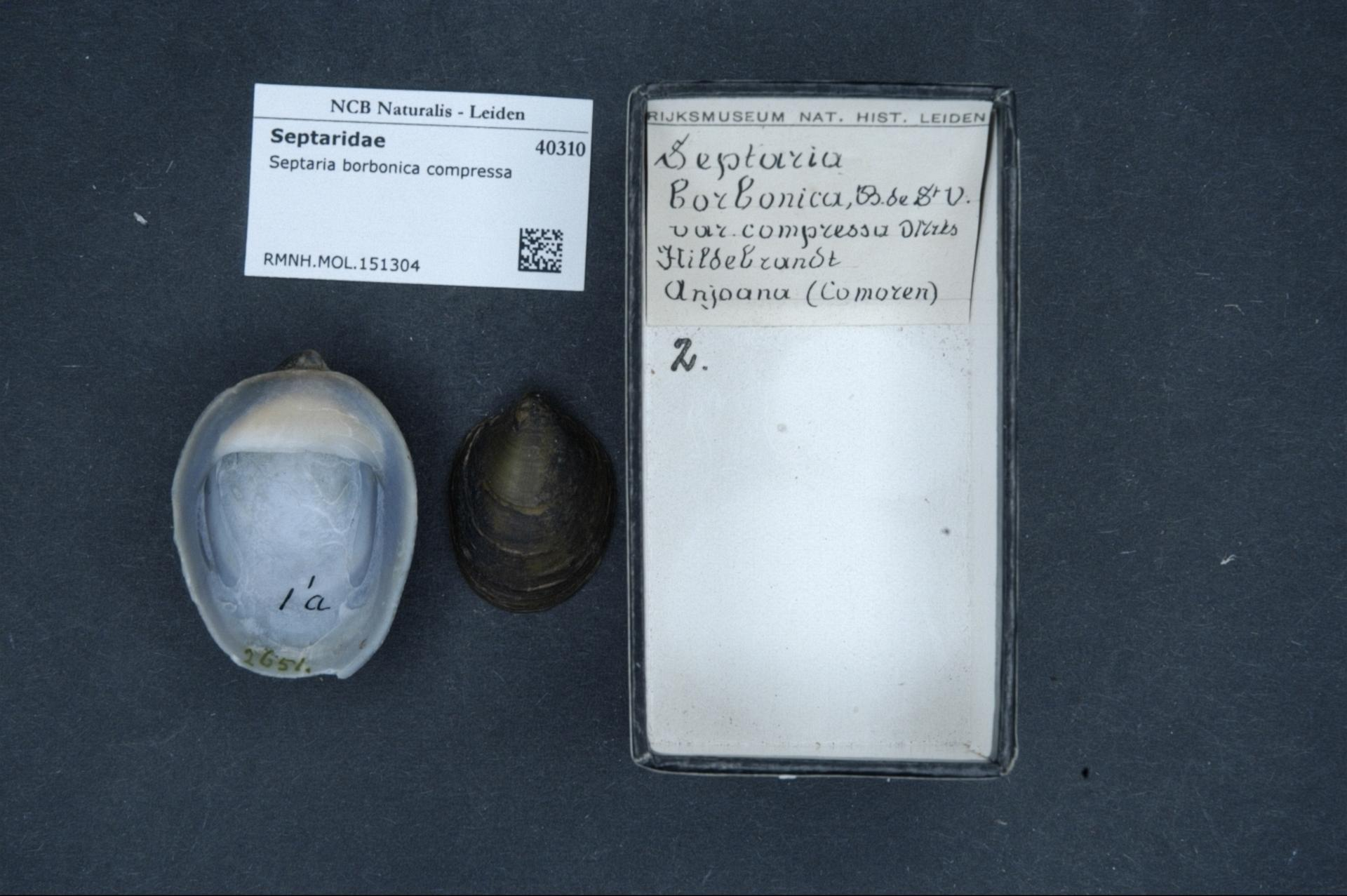
- Septaria porcellana borbonica shells

Scientific classification
- Kingdom: Animalia
- Phylum: Mollusca
- Class: Gastropoda
- Order: Cycloneritida
- Family: Neritidae
- Genus: Septaria
- Species: S. porcellana
- Subspecies: S. p. borbonica

Trinomial name
- Septaria porcellana borbonica (Bory de St Vincent, 1803)

Synonyms
- Cimber tabernaculatus Montfort, 1810 (unnecessary substitute name for...); Navicella borbonica (Bory de St-Vincent, 1804); Navicella borbonica var. compressa E. von Martens, 1881; Patella borbonica Bory de Saint-Vincent, 1804; Septaria borbonica (Bory de Saint-Vincent, 1804) ·

= Septaria porcellana borbonica =

Species of gastropod

Septaria porcellana borbonica is a subspecies of freshwater snail, a gastropod mollusc in the family Neritidae.

Septaria porcellana borbonica is the type species of the genus Septaria.

== Distribution ==
Distribution of Septaria porcellana borbonica includes South Africa and islands in the Indian Ocean.

The type locality is Réunion Island.
