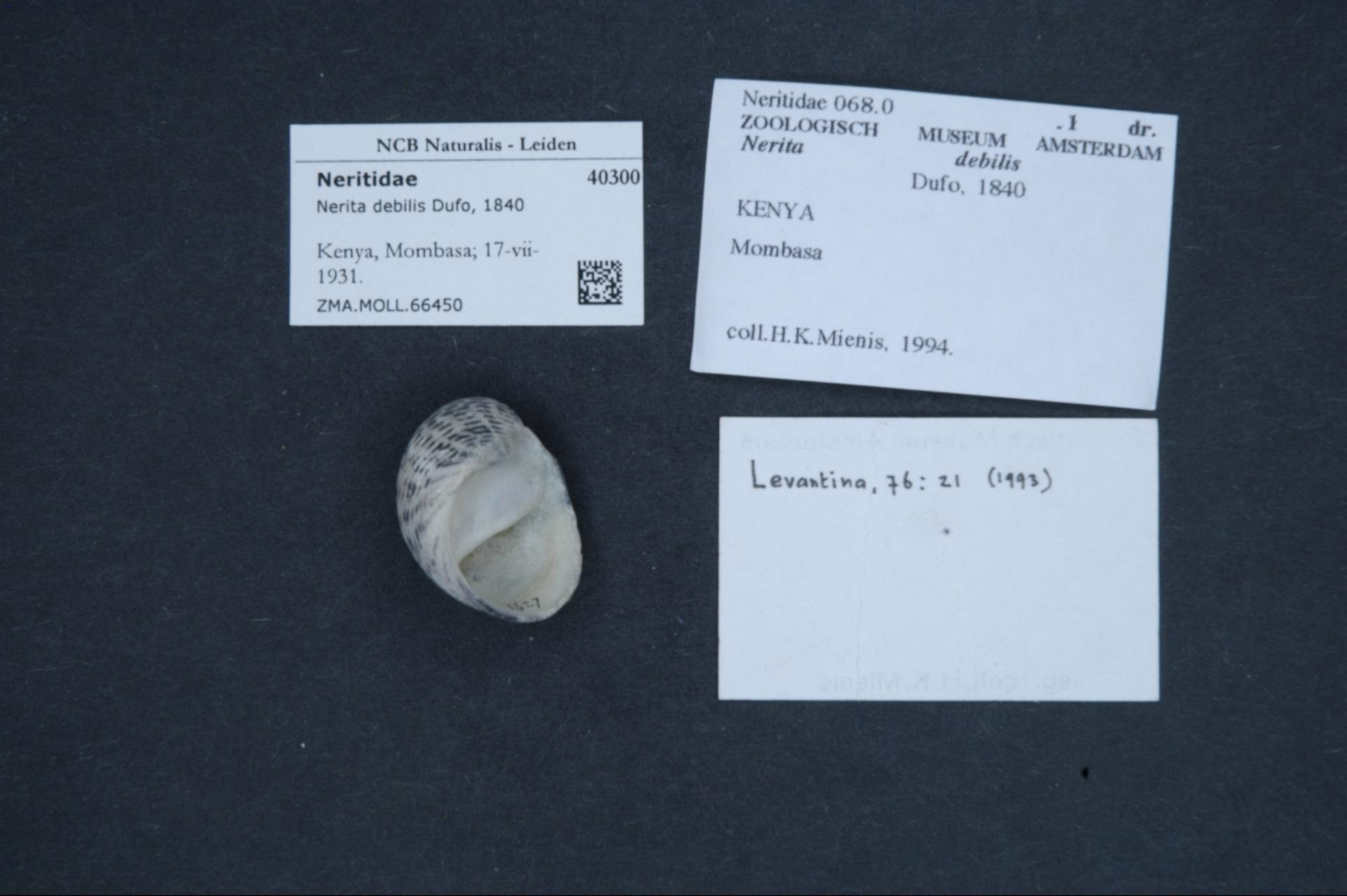

Scientific classification
- Kingdom: Animalia
- Phylum: Mollusca
- Class: Gastropoda
- Order: Cycloneritida
- Family: Neritidae
- Genus: Mienerita
- Species: M. debilis

Binomial name
- Mienerita debilis (Dufo, 1840)

Synonyms
- Nerita debilis Dufo, 1840 (original combination)

= Mienerita debilis =

Species of gastropod

Mienerita debilis is a species of sea snail, a marine gastropod mollusk in the family Neritidae.
