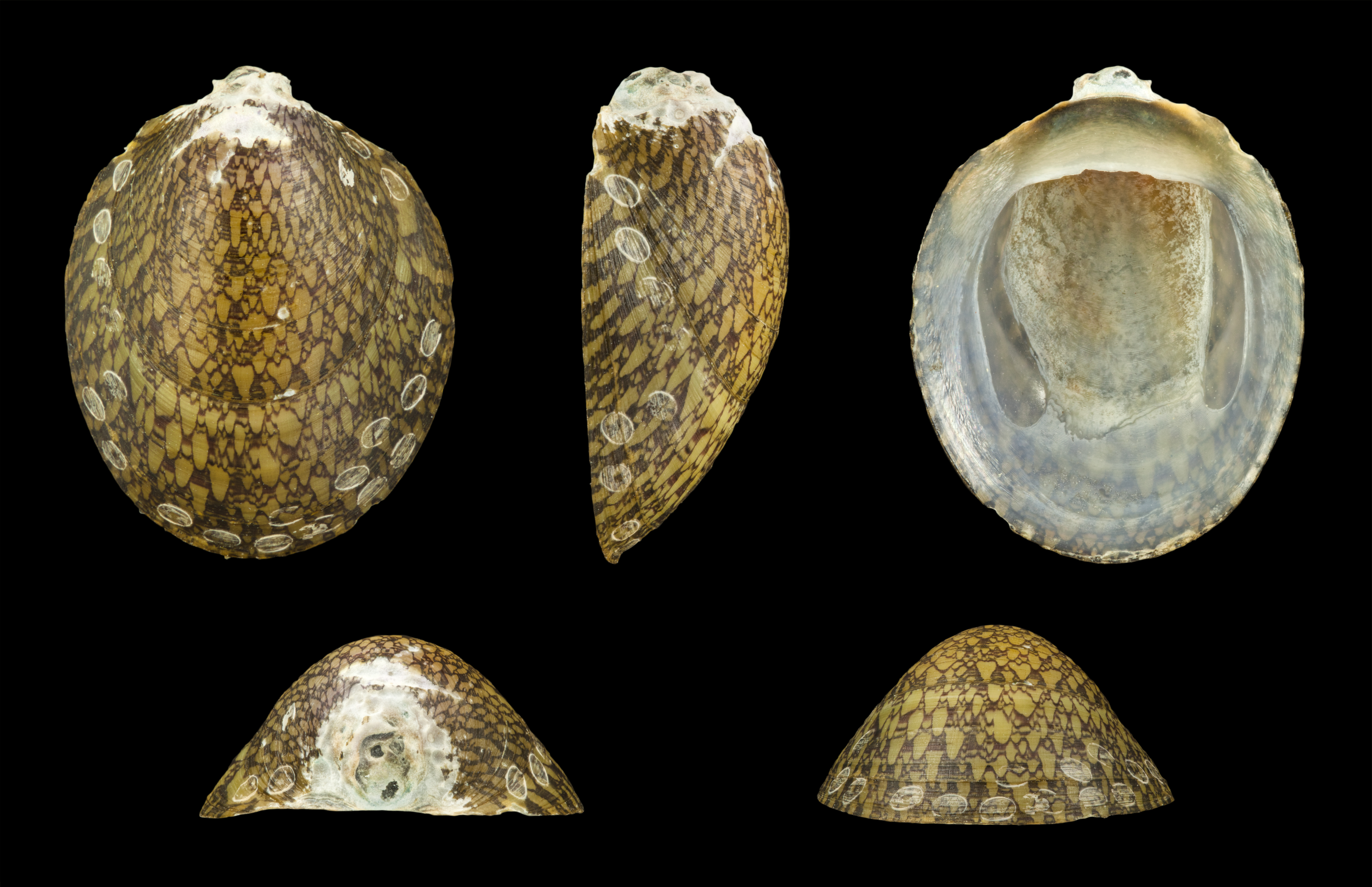
- Shell of Septaria porcellana

Scientific classification
- Kingdom: Animalia
- Phylum: Mollusca
- Class: Gastropoda
- Order: Cycloneritida
- Family: Neritidae
- Genus: Septaria
- Species: S. porcellana

Binomial name
- Septaria porcellana (Linnaeus, 1758)

Synonyms
- Navicella durvillei var. gaymardii Récluz, 1841; Navicella durvillei var. quoyi Récluz, 1841; Navicella porcellana (Linnaeus, 1758); Navicella suborbicularis G. B. Sowerby I, 1825; Navicella zebra Lesson, 1831; Neritina (Dostia) porcellana (Linnaeus, 1758); Patella porcellana Linnaeus, 1758 (original combination)>; Sandalium pictum Schumacher, 1817 (unnecessary substitute name for Patella porcellana); Septaria haustrum (Reeve, 1856); Septaria suborbicularis (G. B. Sowerby I, 1825); Septaria suborbicularis var. compressa E. von Martens, 1897 (suspected synonym)

= Septaria porcellana =

Species of gastropod

Septaria porcellana is a species of freshwater snail, a gastropod mollusc in the family Neritidae.

== Subspecies ==
- Septaria porcellana borbonica (Bory de Saint-Vincent, 1804)
- Septaria porcellana porcellana (Linnaeus, 1758)

== Distribution ==
The geographical distribution of Septaria porcellana includes India, the Philippines, Indonesia, New Guinea and New Caledonia, found in still and swift currents on stones anywhere from a few meters from the sea to 5-6 kilometers inland.

== Description ==
The length of the shell attains 13.1 mm. The shell is symmetrical, cap-like and relatively deep and wide. The outside base color is yellow-brown with a black or purple-pink pattern of triangles and horizontal lines. Inside is white to light gray, septum narrow, and its edge curved and tinged yellow.

Sexual dimorphism in the species presents as males being generally smaller than females. Male reproductive organs consist of a large flap-like penis with a papilla and a small auxiliary gland. Females have a ventral remnant of a spermatophore sac without spermatophores.

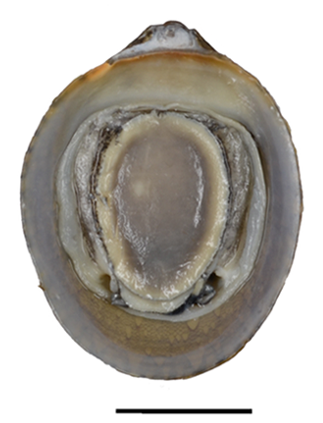
Ventral view of a Septaria porcellana. Scale bar is 10 mm.

== Life cycle ==
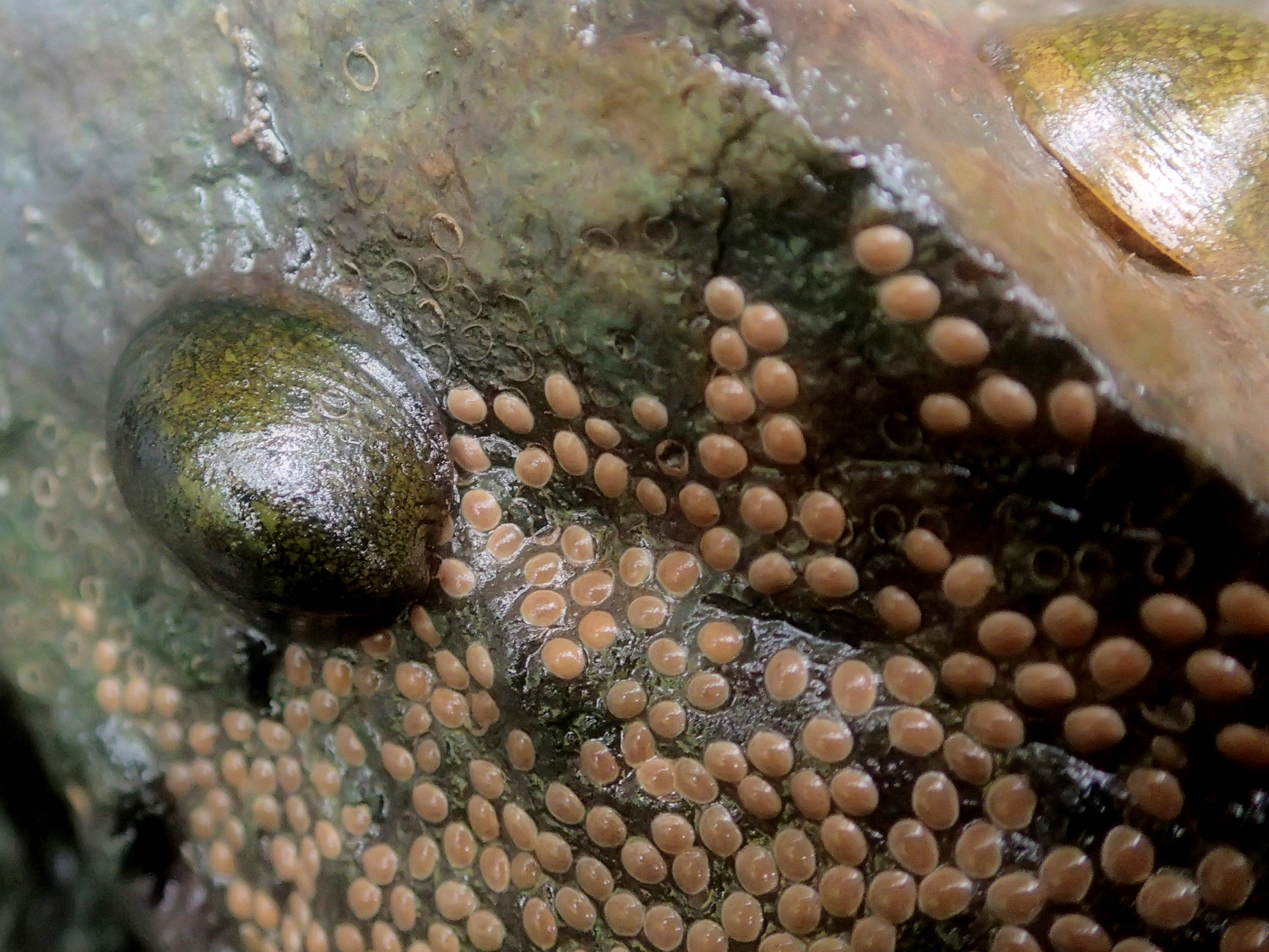
Septaria porcellana and its egg capsules.

== Human use ==
This species is sold in the ornamental pet trade for use in freshwater aquaria.
