= Clypeolum owenianum =

Conservation status
- Least Concern (IUCN 3.1)

Scientific classification
- Kingdom: Animalia
- Phylum: Mollusca
- Class: Gastropoda
- Order: Cycloneritida
- Family: Neritidae
- Genus: Clypeolum
- Species: C. owenianum

Binomial name
- Clypeolum owenianum (Wood, 1828)

Synonyms
- Nerita oweniana Wood, 1828; Neritina oweniana (W. Wood, 1828); Neritina tiassalensis E. Binder, 1956

Species of gastropod

Clypeolum owenianum is a species of small freshwater snail with an operculum, an aquatic gastropod mollusk in the family Neritidae, the nerites.

== Distribution ==
This species is found in Africa: in Angola, Cameroon, Ivory Coast, Equatorial Guinea, Gabon, Ghana, Liberia, and Nigeria.

== Habitat ==
This small nerite lives in rivers.
