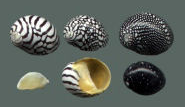
- shells of Puperita pupa and its operculum

Scientific classification
- Kingdom: Animalia
- Phylum: Mollusca
- Class: Gastropoda
- Order: Cycloneritida
- Family: Neritidae
- Genus: Puperita; Gray, 1857

= Puperita =

Genus of gastropods

Puperita is a genus of snails, gastropod mollusks in the family Neritidae.

== Species ==
Species within the genus Puperita include:

- Puperita bensoni (Recluz, 1850)
- Puperita pupa (Linnaeus, 1767) - in the brackish water
