= Neripteron mauriciae =

Scientific classification
- Kingdom: Animalia
- Phylum: Mollusca
- Class: Gastropoda
- Order: Cycloneritida
- Family: Neritidae
- Genus: Neripteron
- Species: N. mauriciae

Binomial name
- Neripteron mauriciae (Lesson, 1831)

Synonyms
- Neripteron (Neripteron) mauriciae (Lesson, 1831)· accepted, alternate representation; Neritina (Neripteron) mauriciae Lesson, 1831 (basionym); Neritina mauriciae Lesson, 1831 (original combination); Neritina salmacida Morelet, 1879; Puperita salmacida (Morelet, 1879) (junior synonym)

Species of gastropod

Neripteron mauriciae is a species of sea snail, a marine gastropod mollusk in the family Neritidae.

== Distribution ==
This species occurs on the Comoro Islands.
