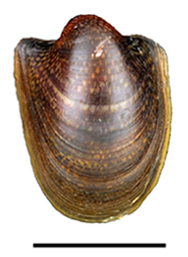
- Neripteron auriculatum shell

Scientific classification
- Kingdom: Animalia
- Phylum: Mollusca
- Class: Gastropoda
- Order: Cycloneritida
- Family: Neritidae
- Genus: Neripteron
- Species: N. auriculatum

Binomial name
- Neripteron auriculatum (Lamarck, 1816)

Synonyms
- Neripteron (Neripteron) auriculatum (Lamarck, 1816)· accepted, alternate representation; Neripteron schneideri Riech, 1935; Nerita dubia Turton, 1932; Nerita subalata Souleyet, 1842; Nerita tomlini Turton, 1933; Neritina (Neripteron) auriculata Lamarck, 1816; Neritina alata Broderip & G. B. Sowerby I, 1829; Neritina auriculata Lamarck, 1816 (original combination); Neritina deshayesii Pease, 1868; Neritina inaurita Mörch, 1872; Neritina layardi Reeve, 1855; Neritina marmorata Brazier, 1877

= Neripteron auriculatum =

Species of gastropod

Neripteron auriculatum is a species of brackish water and freshwater snail, an aquatic gastropod mollusk in the family Neritidae, the nerites.

Neripteron auriculatum is the type species of the genus Neripteron.

== Distribution ==
Primarily found in India, possibly also in other parts of the Indian subcontinent (to be verified).

== Description ==
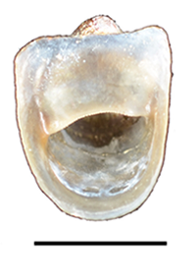
Apertural view of a shell of Neripteron auriculatum.

== Human use ==
It is a part of ornamental pet trade for freshwater aquaria.
