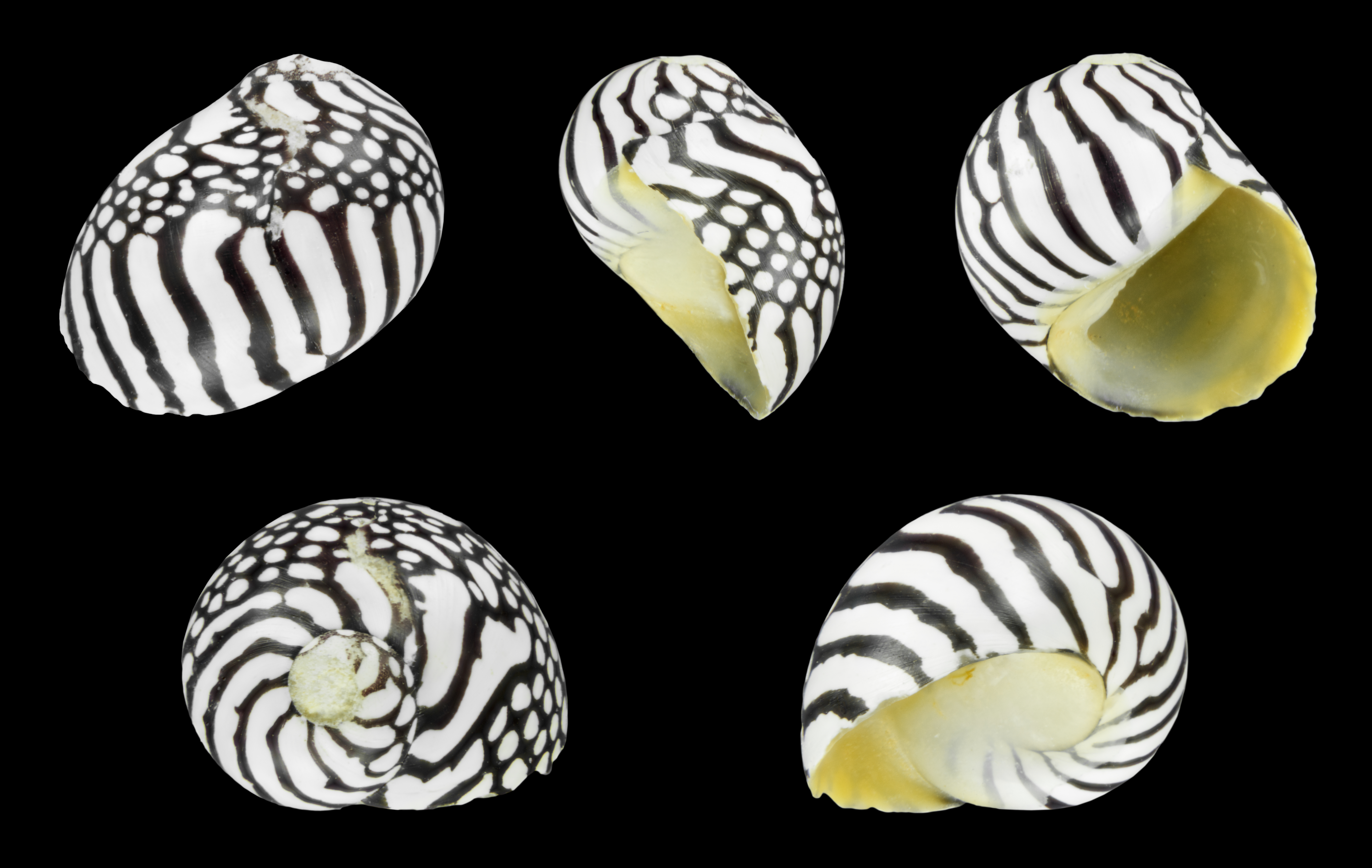
- Puperita pupa: A. ventral view, B. dorsal view; C. Operculum external view; D. Operculum internal view. E. detail of the color standard.
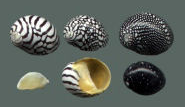
- Four Shells of Puperita pupa showing color variation, one showing the ventral side and on the lower left, an operculum

Scientific classification
- Kingdom: Animalia
- Phylum: Mollusca
- Class: Gastropoda
- Order: Cycloneritida
- Family: Neritidae
- Genus: Puperita
- Species: P. pupa

Binomial name
- Puperita pupa (Linnaeus, 1767)

= Puperita pupa =

Species of gastropod

Puperita pupa, commonly known as zebra nerite, is a species of small sea snail, a marine gastropod mollusk in the family Neritidae, the nerites.

== Description ==
The shell is thin but strong, globular, not presenting a prominent spire. There are 2 to 3 whorls, the outer lip is thin and sharp, the columellar area is polished and has a broad wall. The largest known specimens reach 10.6 mm. Th shell coloration is variable but is characterized by axial bands of black and white like a zebra. The opening is gray with an ocher-colored parietal callus area, and the operculum is bright yellow

== Distribution ==
Puperita pupa is a nerite that is widely distributed in the area of the Caribbean Sea and the Gulf of Mexico:

- Caribbean Sea
- Cayman Islands
- Colombia
- Costa Rica
- Cuba
- Gulf of Mexico
- Hispaniola
- Jamaica
- Lesser Antilles
- Mexico
- San Andres
- Venezuela

This species occurs in brackish water on the West Indian island of Dominica.
