= Neripteron vespertinum =

Conservation status
- Critically Imperiled (NatureServe)

Scientific classification
- Kingdom: Animalia
- Phylum: Mollusca
- Class: Gastropoda
- Order: Cycloneritida
- Superfamily: Neritoidea
- Family: Neritidae
- Genus: Neripteron
- Species: N. vespertinum

Binomial name
- Neripteron vespertinum (Sowerby II, 1849)

Synonyms
- Neripteron (Neripteron) vespertinum (Sowerby II, 1849); Neritina (Neripteron) vespertina Sowerby II, 1849; Neritina vespertina Sowerby II, 1849; Theodoxus vespertinus (Sowerby II, 1849)

Species of snail

Neripteron vespertinum is a species of freshwater snail, an aquatic gastropod mollusc in the family Neritidae.

== Description ==
Its shell is flattened, generally thin, covered in a thick epidermis, and has a smooth interior and exterior. The shell has an apparent olive green color that slickly grades into a dark black or a light brown color. The width of the shell can go up to 1 inch, with wing resembling projections that start from the apex.

== Distribution and habitat ==
This species is endemic to Hawai'i and is traditionally found on all the Hawaiian Islands. This mollusk is almost always found in freshwater, specifically the slightly briny bottommost untouched small streams near big rocks. They are also found in estuaries, on firm surfaces such as rocks, boulders, and bridge supports.

== Conservation status ==
The conservation status for the N. vespertinum is currently critically imperiled. Possible or ongoing threats to this mollusk include stream channelization and burial, pollution, water diversions; which have strained the distribution and abundance of these mollusks. Even more so, runoff or extensive flooding-resulting in high sedimentation turbidity, nutrients, trash and other pollutants emptying into streams, rivers, estuaries, and oceans also pose a crucial threat.
