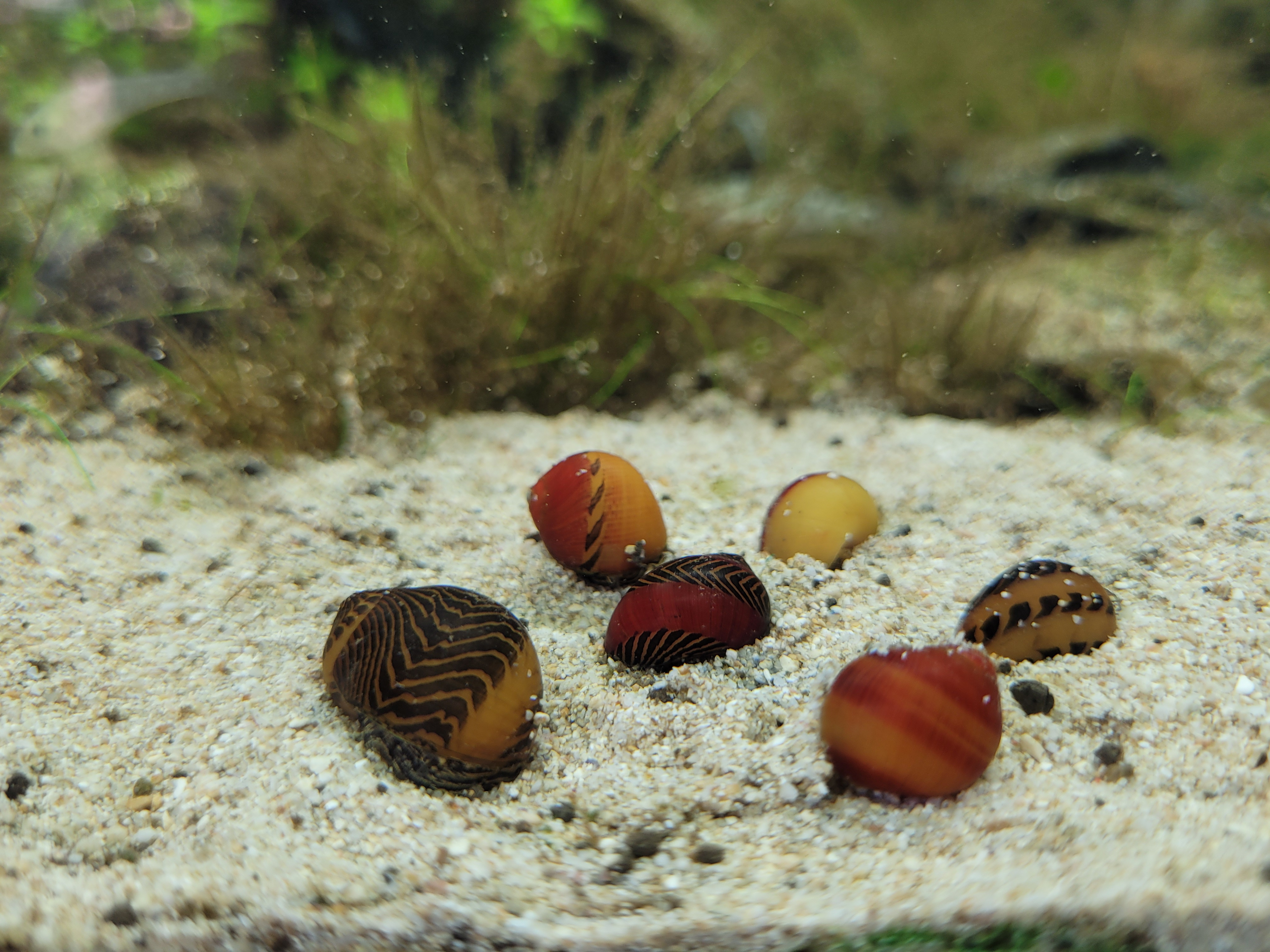
- Vittina waigiensis from the Philippines
- Variability of the shell patterns of Vittina waigiensis

Conservation status
- Least Concern (IUCN 3.1)

Scientific classification
- Kingdom: Animalia
- Phylum: Mollusca
- Class: Gastropoda
- Order: Cycloneritida
- Family: Neritidae
- Genus: Vittina
- Species: V. waigiensis

Binomial name
- Vittina waigiensis (Lesson, 1831)

Synonyms
- Neritina waigiensis Lesson, 1831

= Vittina waigiensis =

Species of gastropod endemic to the Philippines

Vittina waigiensis, commonly known as the red racer nerite or the gold racer nerite, is a species of a freshwater, brackish water, or marine snail native to the Philippines and Indonesia (Sulawesi and the Maluku Islands). It belongs to the family Neritidae. Red racer nerites have colorful shells that display extremely variable patterns, which makes them popular in the aquarium trade. They are also known as zebra nerites, along with other species of nerite snails with similar shell patterns.

== Description ==
Red racer nerites are small snails that only grow to a maximum diameter of 3 cm (1.2 in). They have shells that have highly variable patterns in red, orange, yellow, black, and white. The patterns often form bands of repeating "arrows" resembling racing stripes, which is the source of their common name "racer." Red racer snails are amphibious and occasionally venture above the waterline. They can tolerate freshwater, brackish water, and saltwater habitats. They are usually found in bodies of water with dense vegetation in coastal areas, like mangrove forests and river deltas. They primarily eat algae and biofilm. They lay eggs in clutches of 50 to 100 eggs. Their planktonic larvae can only survive in brackish water. They are relatively long-lived, with a lifespan usually reaching 4 years. These characteristics and their colorful shells make them popular in the aquarium trade.

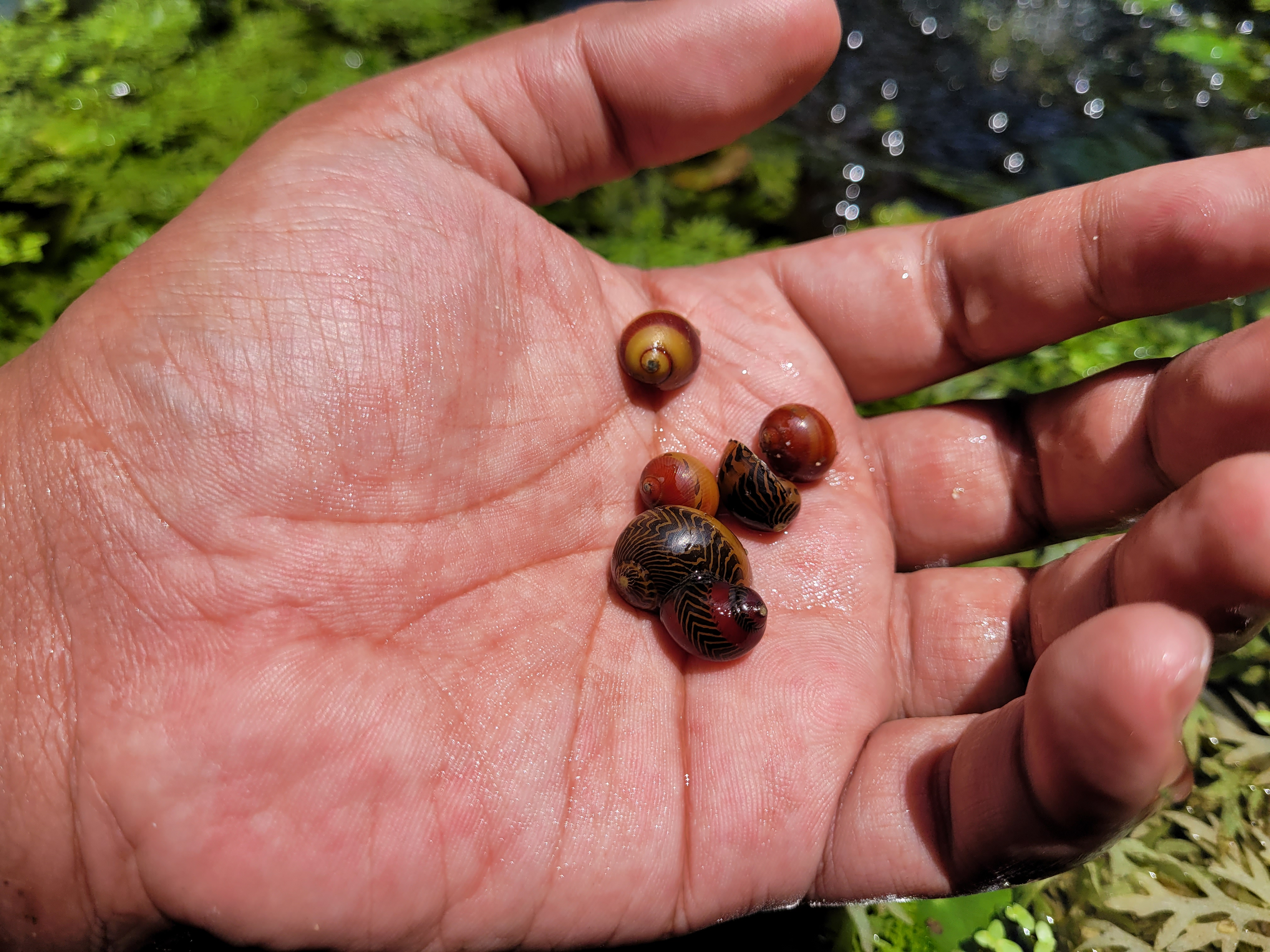
Vittina waigiensis in comparison to a human hand

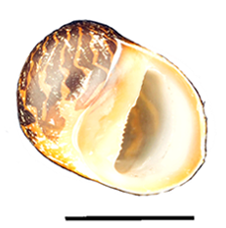
Apertural view of a shell of Vittina waigiensis. Scale bar is 10 mm (0.39 in).

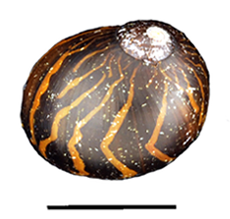
Abapertural view of a shell of Vittina waigiensis. Scale bar is 10 mm (0.39 in).

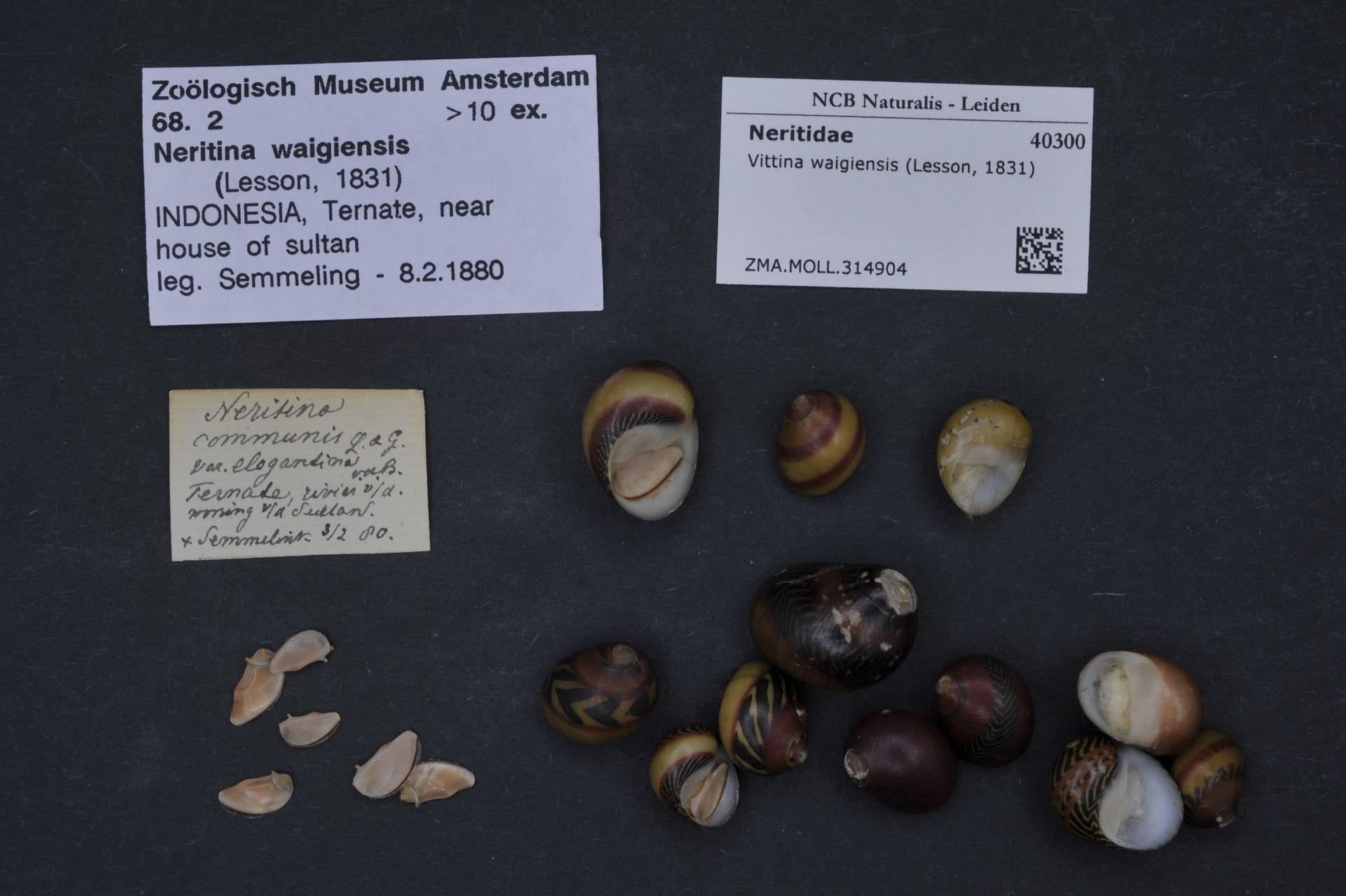
Vittina waigiensis shells and opercula

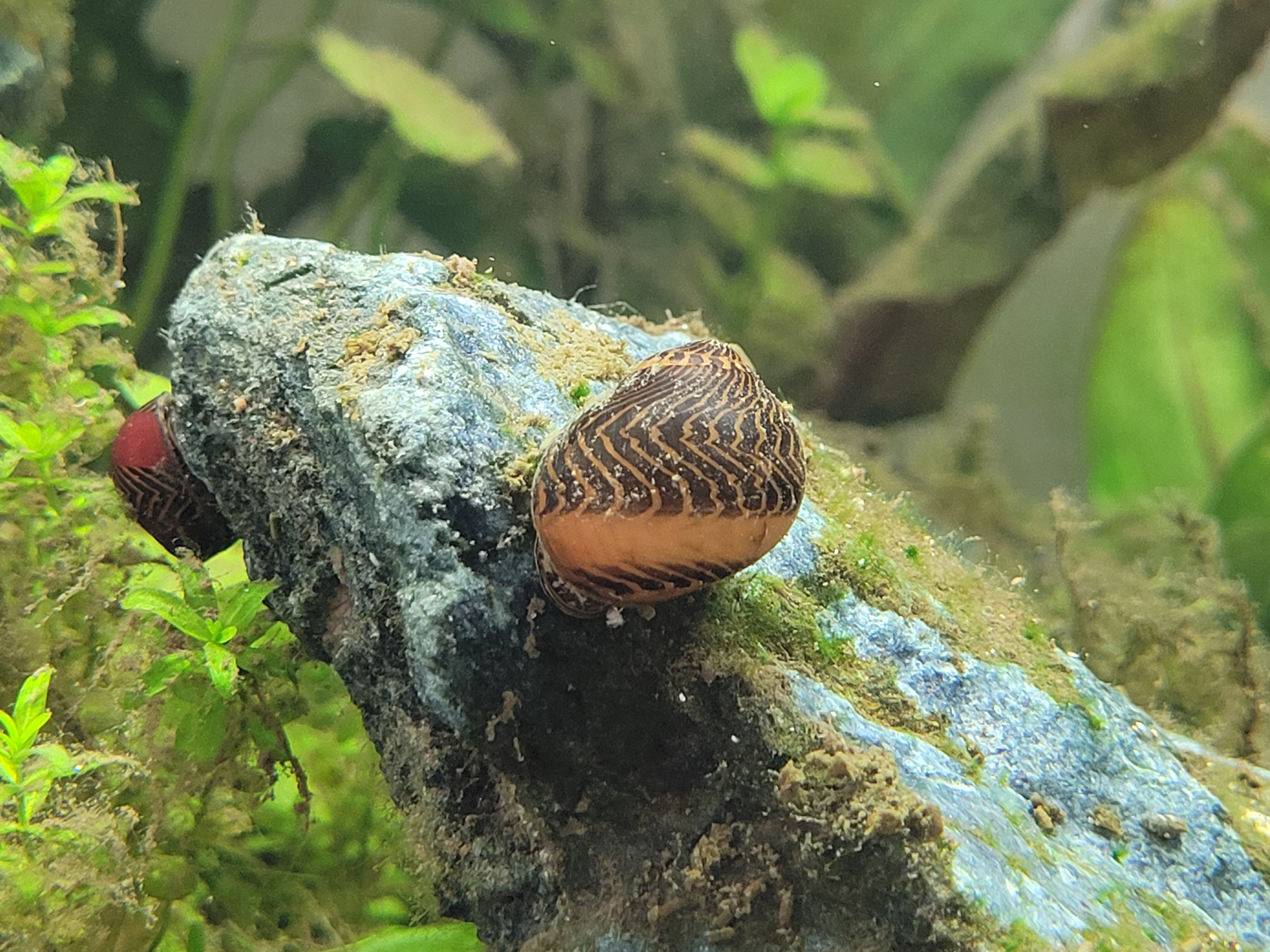
Vittina waigiensis feeding on algae

== Human use ==
Vittina waigiensis is a part of ornamental pet trade for freshwater aquaria.
