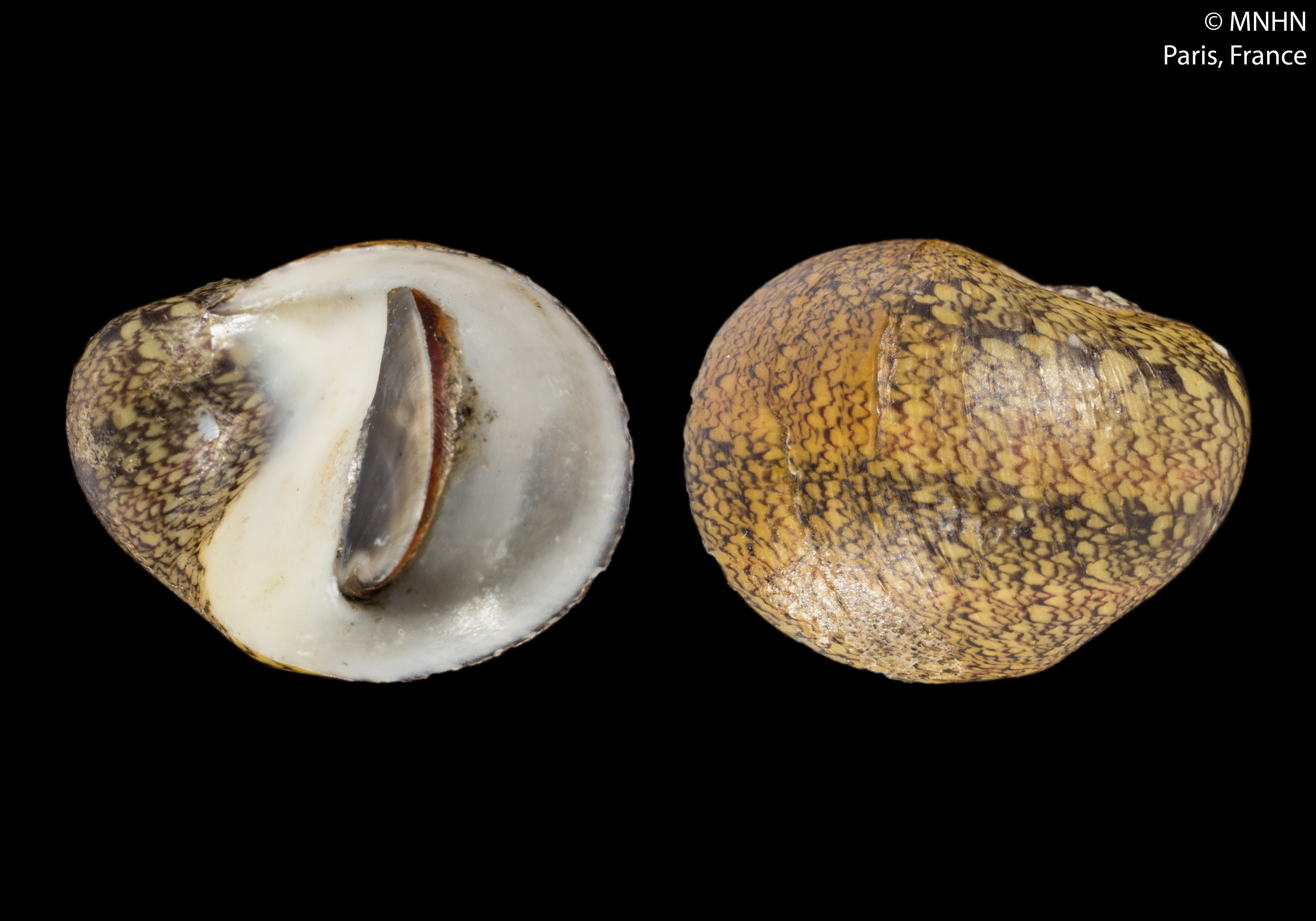
- Shell of Clypeolum latissimum (syntype at MNHN, Paris)

Scientific classification
- Kingdom: Animalia
- Phylum: Mollusca
- Class: Gastropoda
- Order: Cycloneritida
- Superfamily: Neritoidea
- Family: Neritidae
- Genus: Clypeolum; Récluz, 1842

Type species
- Neritina latissima Broderip, 1833

Synonyms
- Neritina (Alina) Récluz, 1842 (invalid: junior homonym of Alina Risso, 1826); Neritina (Clypeolum) Récluz, 1842 (original rank)

= Clypeolum (gastropod) =

Genus of gastropods

Clypeolum is a genus of freshwater snails or brackish snails that have an operculum, aquatic gastropod molluscs in the family Neritidae, the nerites.

== Genera ==
- Clypeolum latissimum (Broderip, 1833)
- Clypeolum owenianum (W. Wood, 1828)

Species brought into synonymy

- Clypeolum planissimum Mousson, 1869: synonym of Neritona planissima (Mousson, 1869) (basionym)
