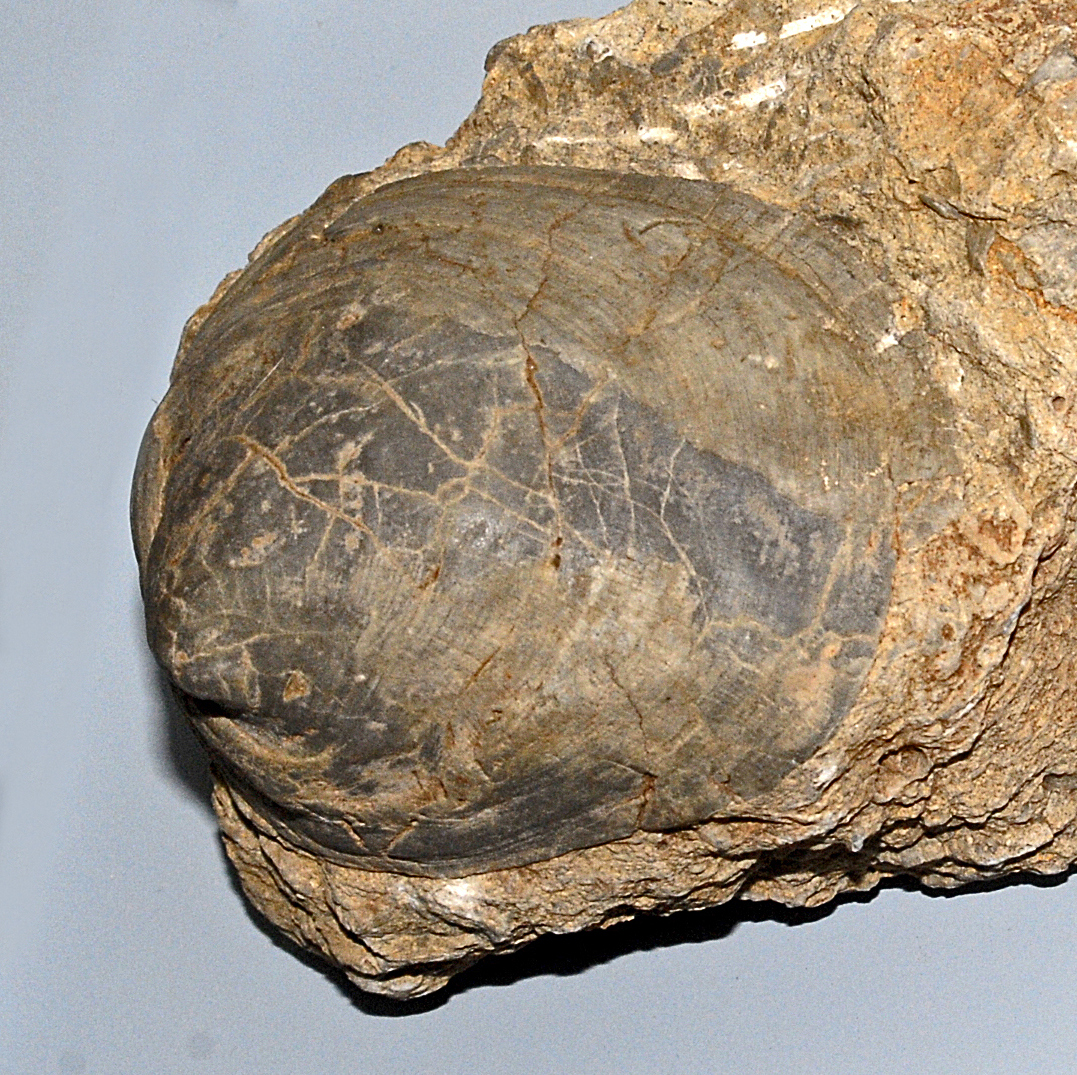
- Fossil of Velates species

Scientific classification
- Kingdom: Animalia
- Phylum: Mollusca
- Class: Gastropoda
- Order: Cycloneritida
- Family: Neritidae
- Subfamily: †Velatinae; Bandel, 2001
- Genus: †Velates; Montfort, 1810

= Velates =

Velates Temporal range: Paleocene - Miocene

Extinct genus of gastropods

Velates is an extinct genus of marine gastropod molluscs belonging to the family Neritidae.

These snails lived from Paleocene to the Miocene (age range: from 58.7 to 11.608 million years ago). Fossil shells within this genus have been found all over the world.

== Species ==
Species within this genus include:

- † Velates balkanicus Bontscheff, 1896
- † Velates californicus Vokes, 1935
- † Velates perversus (Gmelin, 1791)
- † Velates rogeri Abbass, 1967
- † Velates rugatus Abbass, 1967
- † Velates tebanensis Abbass, 1967
- † Velates vizcainoensis Cushing Woods & Saul, 1986
- † Velates vokesi Cooke, 1946

== Description ==
These snails had a heavy, oval shell reaching a length of about 30 millimetres (1.2 in). The earliest regular windings are visible at the top of the shell.
