= Mienerita =

Scientific classification
- Kingdom: Animalia
- Phylum: Mollusca
- Class: Gastropoda
- Order: Cycloneritida
- Superfamily: Neritoidea
- Family: Neritidae
- Genus: Mienerita; Dekker, 2000

Type species
- Nerita debilis Dufo, 1840

Genus of gastropods

Mienerita is a genus of medium-sized to small sea snails with a gill and an operculum, marine gastropod molluscs in the subfamily Neritinae of the family Neritidae, the nerites.

== Species ==
- Mienerita debilis (Dufo, 1840)
