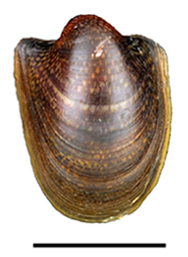
- Shell of Neripteron auriculatum. Scale bar is 10 mm.

Scientific classification
- Kingdom: Animalia
- Phylum: Mollusca
- Class: Gastropoda
- Order: Cycloneritida
- Superfamily: Neritoidea
- Family: Neritidae
- Genus: Neripteron; Lesson, 1831

Type species
- Neritina auriculata Lamarck, 1816

Synonyms
- Clithon (Alinoclithon) H. B. Baker, 1923; Clithon (Neritoclithon) H. B. Baker, 1923; Dostia Gray, 1842; Neripteron (Dostia) Gray, 1842· accepted, alternate representation; Neripteron (Neripteron) Lesson, 1831· accepted, alternate representation; Neripteron (Pseudonerita) H. B. Baker, 1923· accepted, alternate representation; Neritina (Dostia) Gray, 1842; Neritina (Neripteron) Lesson, 1831; Neritopteron P. Fischer, 1885 (unjustified emendation of Neripteron); Pseudonerita H. B. Baker, 1923

= Neripteron =

Genus of gastropods

Neripteron is a genus of brackish water and freshwater snails, an aquatic gastropod mollusks in the subfamily Neritininae of the family Neritidae, the nerites.

Neripteron auriculatum is the type species of the genus Neripteron.

== Species ==
Species within the genus Neripteron include:

- Neripteron amoenum (Gould, 1847)
- Neripteron auriculatum (Lamarck, 1816)
- Neripteron bensoni (Récluz, 1850)
- Neripteron bicanaliculatum (Récluz, 1843)
- Neripteron cariosum (W. Wood, 1828)
- Neripteron cornucopia (Benson, 1836)
- Neripteron dilatatum (Broderip, 1833)
- Neripteron holosericeum (Garrett, 1872)
- Neripteron lecontei (Récluz, 1853)
- Neripteron mauriciae (Lesson, 1831)
- Neripteron neglectum (Pease, 1861)
- Neripteron obtusum (G. B. Sowerby I, 1836)
- Neripteron pileolus (Récluz, 1850)
- Neripteron platyconcha (Annandale & Prashad, 1919)
- Neripteron rostratum (Reeve, 1856)
- Neripteron rubicundum (Martens, 1875)
- Neripteron simoni (Prashad, 1921)
- Neripteron siquijorense (Récluz, 1844)
- Neripteron spirale (Reeve, 1855)
- Neripteron subauriculatum (Récluz, 1843)
- Neripteron subviolaceum Eichhorst, 2016
- Neripteron taitense (Lesson, 1831)
- Neripteron vespertinum (G. B. Sowerby II, 1849)
- Neripteron violaceum (Gmelin, 1791)

Species brought into synonymy

- Neripteron asperulatum (Récluz, 1843): synonym of Neritina asperulata (Récluz, 1843)
- Neripteron holosericum : synonym of Neripteron holosericeum (Garrett, 1872) (misspelling)
- Neripteron schneideri Riech, 1935: synonym of Neripteron auriculatum (Lamarck, 1816)
