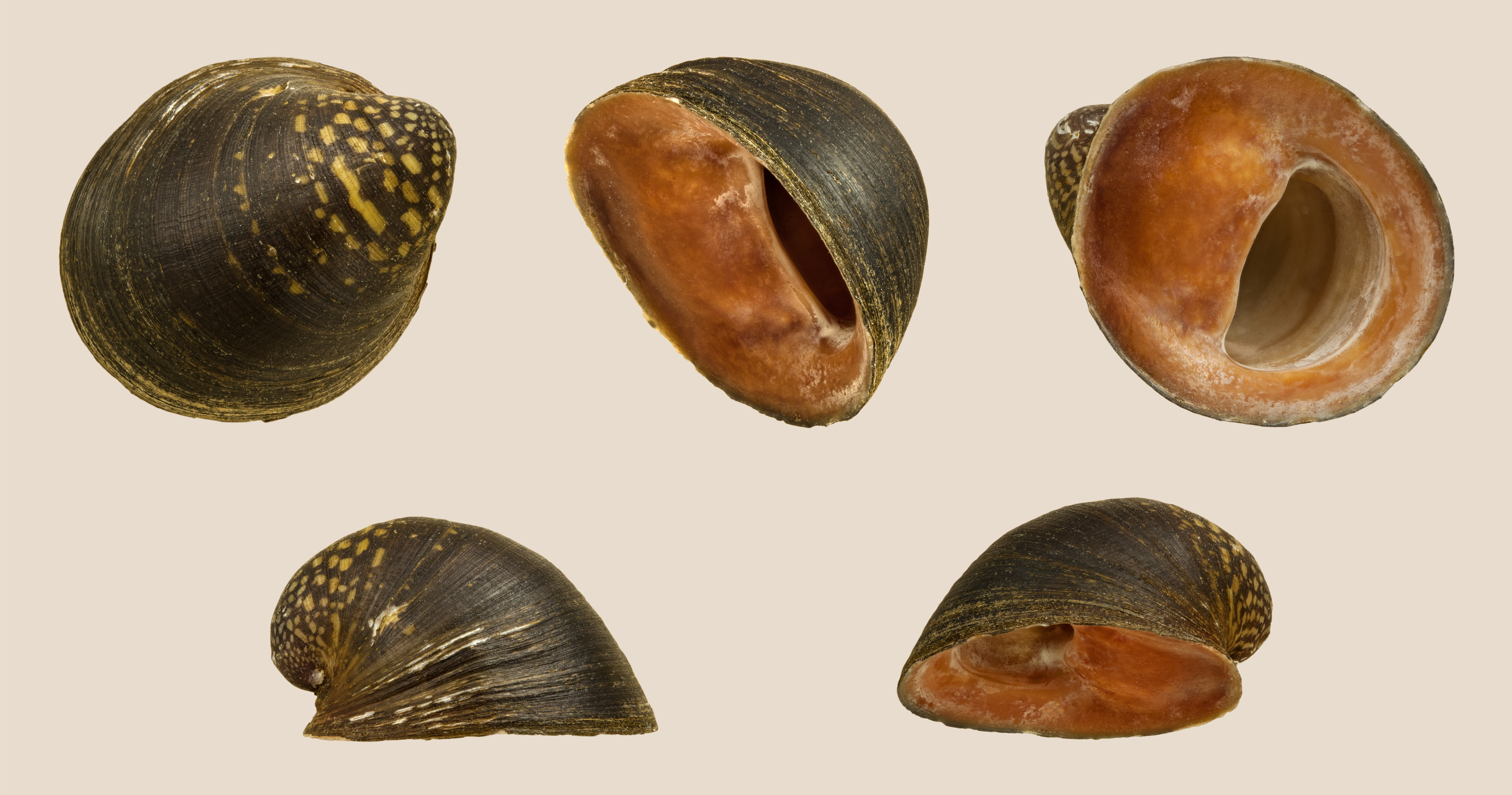

Scientific classification
- Domain: Eukaryota
- Kingdom: Animalia
- Phylum: Mollusca
- Class: Gastropoda
- Subclass: Neritimorpha
- Order: Cycloneritida
- Family: Neritidae
- Genus: Neripteron
- Species: N. violaceum

Binomial name
- Neripteron violaceum (Gmelin, 1791)

Synonyms
- Dostia crepidularia (Lamarck, 1822); Neripteron (Dostia) violaceum (Gmelin, 1791); Nerita violacea Gmelin, 1791 (original combination); Neritina (Dostia) crepidularia Lamarck, 1822; Neritina (Dostia) violacea (Gmelin, 1791); Neritina crepidularia Lamarck, 1822; Neritina depressa Benson, 1836; Neritina exaltata Récluz, 1850; Neritina gracilenta G. B. Sowerby I, 1825; Neritina mesopotamica Mousson, 1874; Neritina mitrula Menke, 1830; Neritina montrouzieri Gassies, 1875; Neritina plumata Menke, 1830; Neritina schaeflii Mousson, 1874; Neritina tourannensis Souleyet, 1842; Neritina violacea (Gmelin, 1791)

= Neripteron violaceum =

Species of gastropod

Neripteron violaceum is a species of brackish water snail, an aquatic gastropod mollusk in the family Neritidae, the nerites.

== Description ==
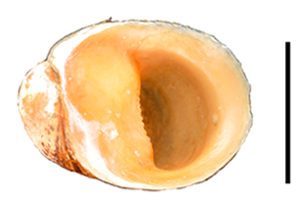
Apertural view of a shell of Neripteron violaceum.

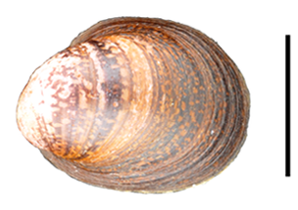
Abapertural view of a shell of Neripteron violaceum.

== Distribution ==
India: Andaman Islands, Andhra Pradesh, Goa, Gujarat, Kerala, Kamataka, Orissa, Tamilnadu and West Bengal; Sri Lanka, Burma, Thailand, Cambodia, Vietnam, Singapore, Indonesia, Timor, New Caledonia, Samoa, Fiji, Australia, Philippines and Japan

== Human use ==
It is a part of ornamental pet trade for freshwater aquaria.
