= Neritodryas cornea =

- A shell of Neritodryas cornea

Scientific classification
- Kingdom: Animalia
- Phylum: Mollusca
- Class: Gastropoda
- Order: Cycloneritida
- Family: Neritidae
- Genus: Neritodryas
- Species: N. cornea

Binomial name
- Neritodryas cornea (Linnaeus, 1758)

Synonyms
- Nerita cornea Linnaeus, 1758 (original combination); Neritina amphibia Lesson, 1831; Neritina ampullaria Lesson, 1831; Neritina cornea (Linnaeus, 1758) (new combination)

Species of gastropod

Neritodryas cornea, the horny nerite, is a species of freshwater snail, an aquatic gastropod mollusc in the family Neritidae, the nerites.

Neritodryas cornea is the type species of the genus Neritodryas.

== Description ==
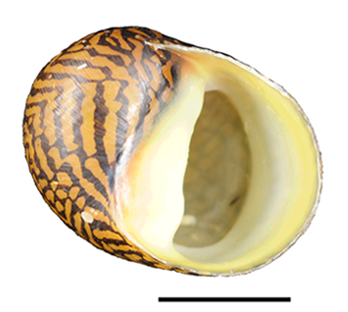
Apertural view of a shell of Neritodryas cornea.

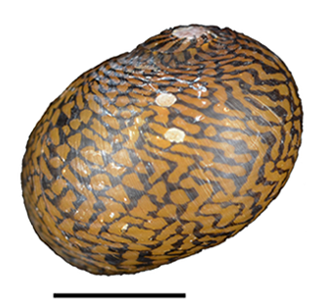
Abapertural view of a shell of Neritodryas cornea.

== Human use ==
It is a part of ornamental pet trade for freshwater aquaria.
