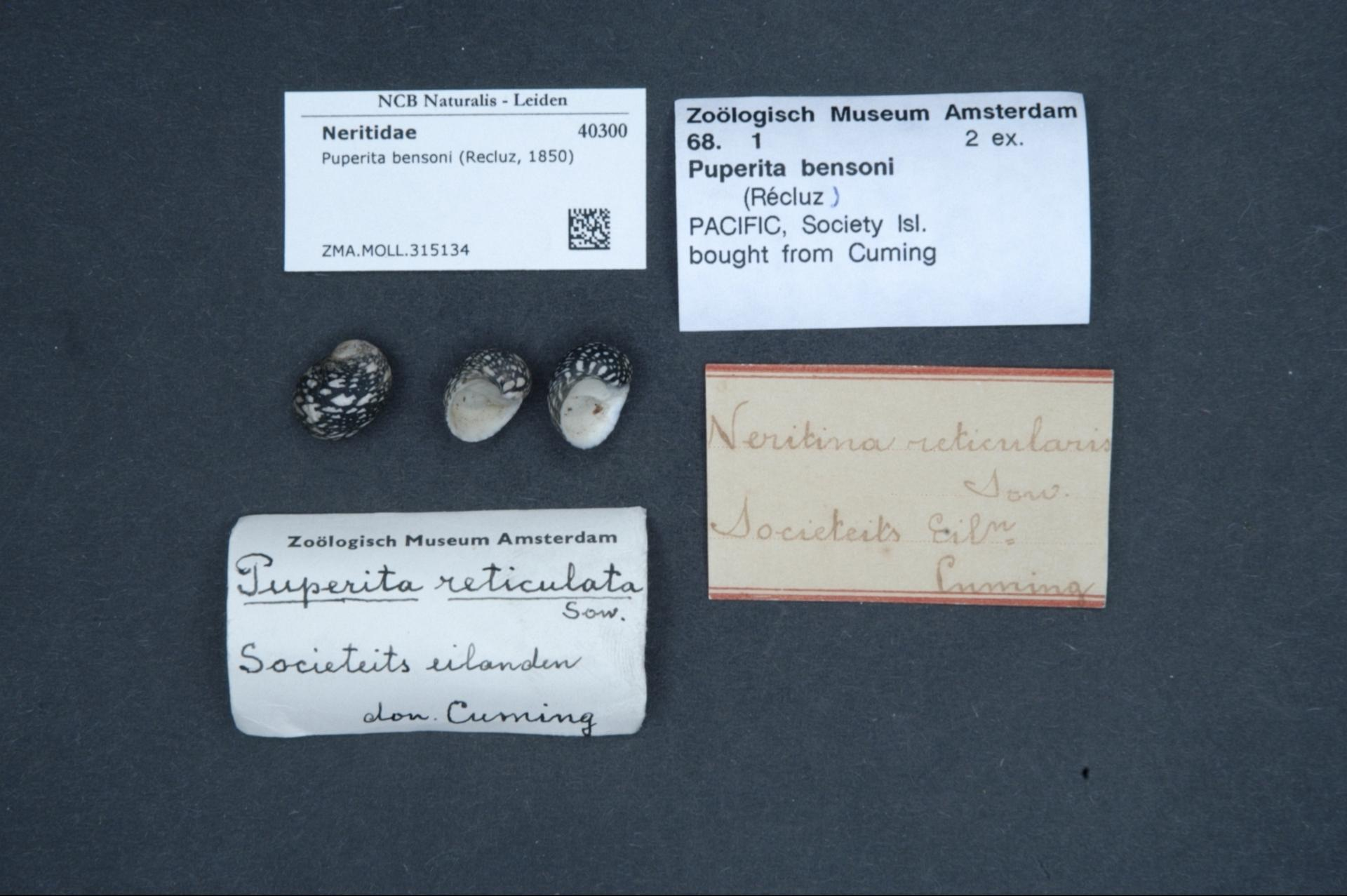

Scientific classification
- Kingdom: Animalia
- Phylum: Mollusca
- Class: Gastropoda
- Order: Cycloneritida
- Family: Neritidae
- Genus: Neripteron
- Species: N. bensoni

Binomial name
- Neripteron bensoni (Recluz, 1850)

Synonyms
- Nerita bensoni Récluz, 1850

= Neripteron bensoni =

Species of gastropod

Neripteron bensoni is a species of sea snail, a marine gastropod mollusk in the family Neritidae.

== Distribution ==
This species occurs in the Indian Ocean off the Mascarene Basin.
