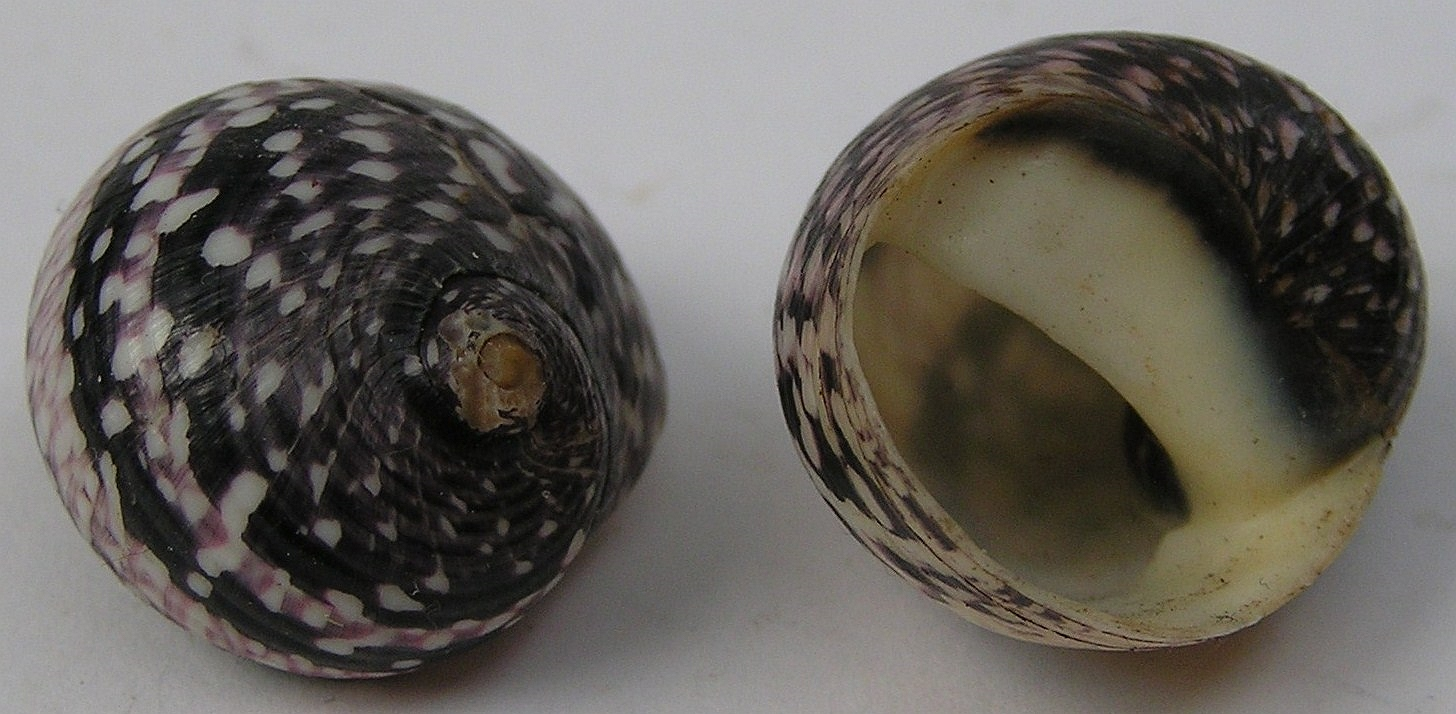
- Two shells of Neritodryas cornea

Scientific classification
- Kingdom: Animalia
- Phylum: Mollusca
- Class: Gastropoda
- Order: Cycloneritida
- Superfamily: Neritoidea
- Family: Neritidae
- Genus: Neritodryas; Martens, 1869

Type species
- Nerita cornea Linnaeus, 1758

= Neritodryas =

Neritodryas Temporal range: Early Eocene-Recent

Genus of gastropods

Neritodryas is a genus of freshwater snails, (some of which are amphibious and terrestrial living on trees and bushes); they are gastropod molluscs in the family Neritidae, the nerites.

The length of the shell is up to 40 mm.

== Species ==
Species within the genus Neritodryas include:

- Neritodryas chimmoi (Reeve, 1856)
- Neritodryas cornea (Linnaeus, 1758) - type species of the genus Neritodryas
- Neritodryas dubia (Gmelin, 1791)
- † Neritodryas dutemplei (Deshayes, 1864) - synonym: Nerita dutemplei
- † Neritodryas globosa (J. de C. Sowerby, 1823) - synonym: Nerita globosa
- † Neritodryas guillioui Symonds & Pacaud, 2010
- Neritodryas javanica Eichhorst, 2016
- † Neritodryas laubrierei (Cossmann, 1888)
- Neritodryas notabilis Riech, 1935
- Neritodryas simplex Schepman, 1919
- Neritodryas subsulcata (G. B. Sowerby I, 1836)
