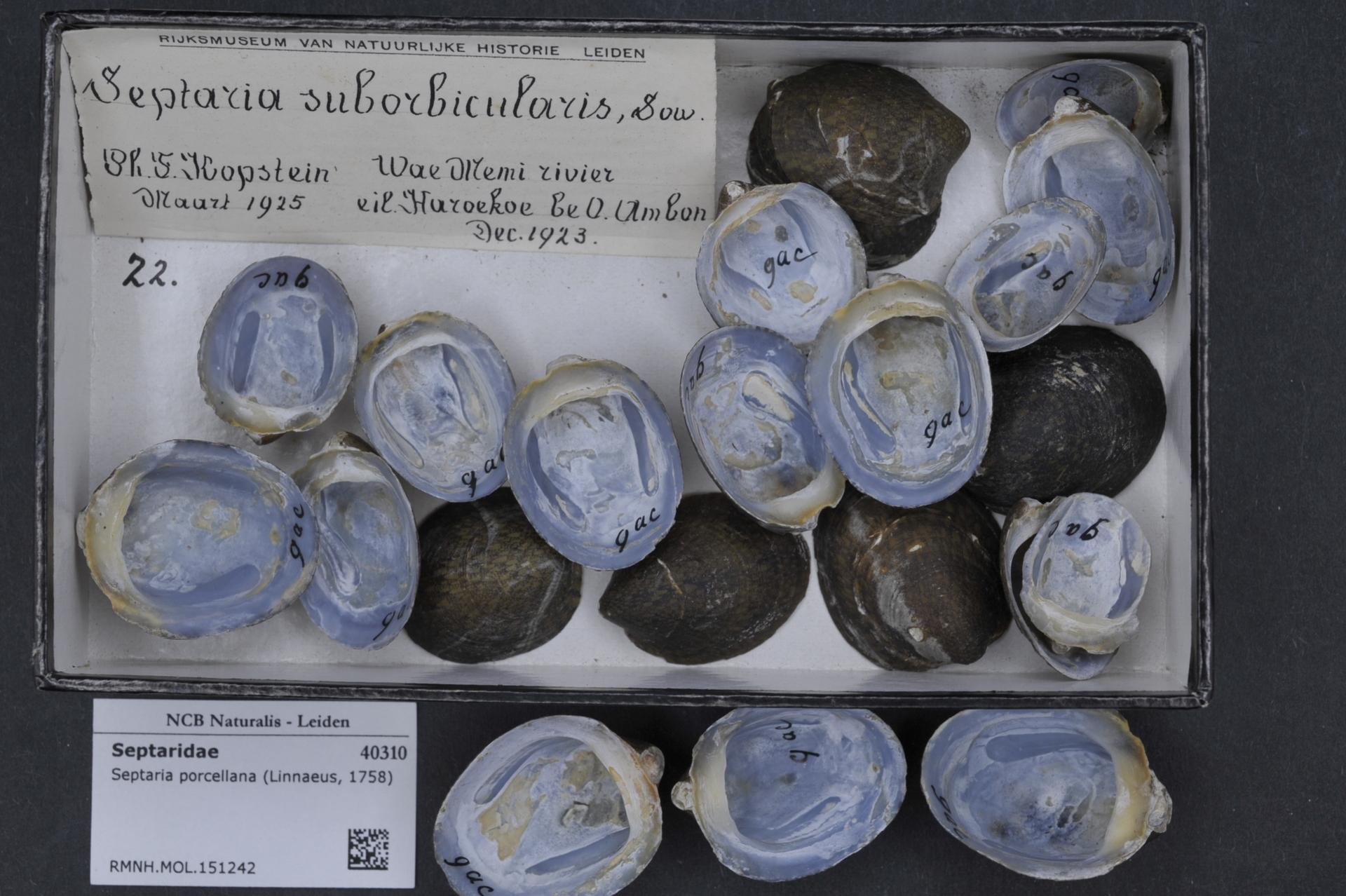
- Septaria porcellana shells

Scientific classification
- Kingdom: Animalia
- Phylum: Mollusca
- Class: Gastropoda
- Order: Cycloneritida
- Family: Neritidae
- Subfamily: Neritininae
- Genus: Septaria; Férussac, 1803

Type species
- Patella borbonica Saint-Vincent, 1803

Synonyms
- Catillus Gray, 1847; Catillus (Elara) H. Adams & A. Adams, 1854; Catillus (Laodia) Gray, 1868; Cimber Montfort, 1810; Navicella Lamarck, 1816; Orthopoma Gray, 1868; Paria Gray, 1868; Sandalium Schumacher, 1817; Septaria (Navicella) Lamarck, 1816; Stenopoma Gray, 1868

= Septaria (gastropod) =

Genus of gastropods

Septaria is a genus of freshwater and brackish water snails, gastropod molluscs in the family Neritidae.

These superficially limpet-like snails are native to the Indo-Pacific region. Most species are found in rivers and streams, mainly fast-flowing, but two (S. livida and S. tesselata; sometimes in their own subgenus Navicella) can also live in brackish coastal waters and the lower tidal section of rivers and streams. Their eggs are attached to hard surfaces such as stones. After hatching, many veligers avoid being swept away by the current by swimming close to the bottom, but it is speculated that some flow downstream into the sea only to return to freshwater later. The shell length of these snails is up to 3.3 cm (1.3 in), but there are some size variations depending on the exact species.

== Species ==
Species within the genus Septaria include:

- Septaria apiata (Le Guillou in Récluz, 1841)
- Septaria bougainvillei (Récluz, 1841)
- Septaria clypeolum (Récluz, 1843)
- Septaria cumingiana (Récluz, 1842)
- Septaria freycineti Récluz, 1842
- Septaria janelli (Récluz, 1841)
- Septaria lineata (Lamarck, 1816)
- Septaria livida (Reeve, 1856)
- Septaria luzonica (Souleyet in Récluz, 1842)
- Septaria macrocephala (Le Guillou in Récluz, 1841)
- Septaria porcellana (Linnaeus, 1758)
- Septaria sanguisuga (Reeve, 1856)
- Septaria sculpta (E. von Martens, 1881)
- Septaria tahitiana Eichhorst, 2016
- Septaria tessellata (Lamarck, 1816)
- Septaria tessellaria (Lamarck, 1816)
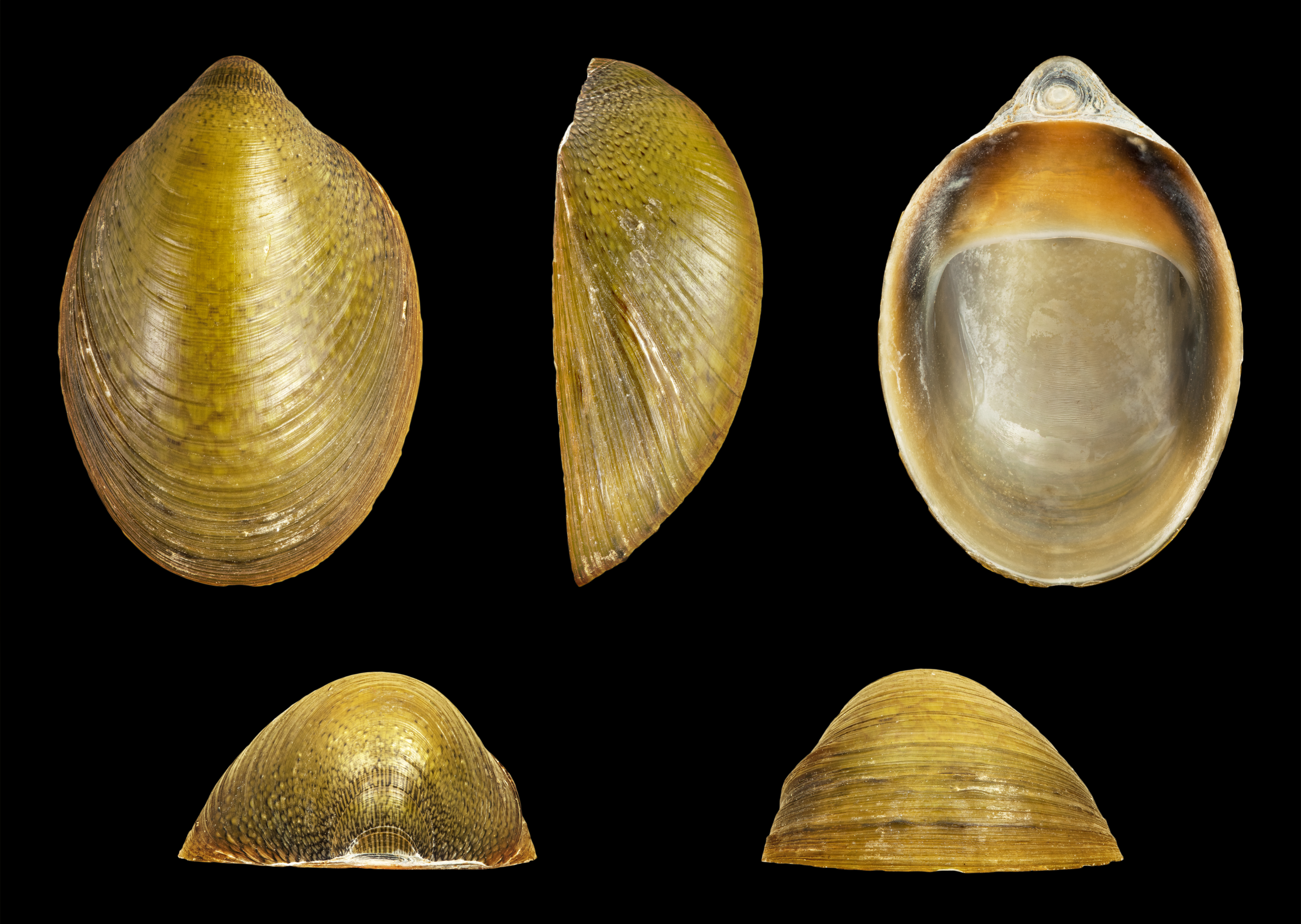
Septaria luzonica

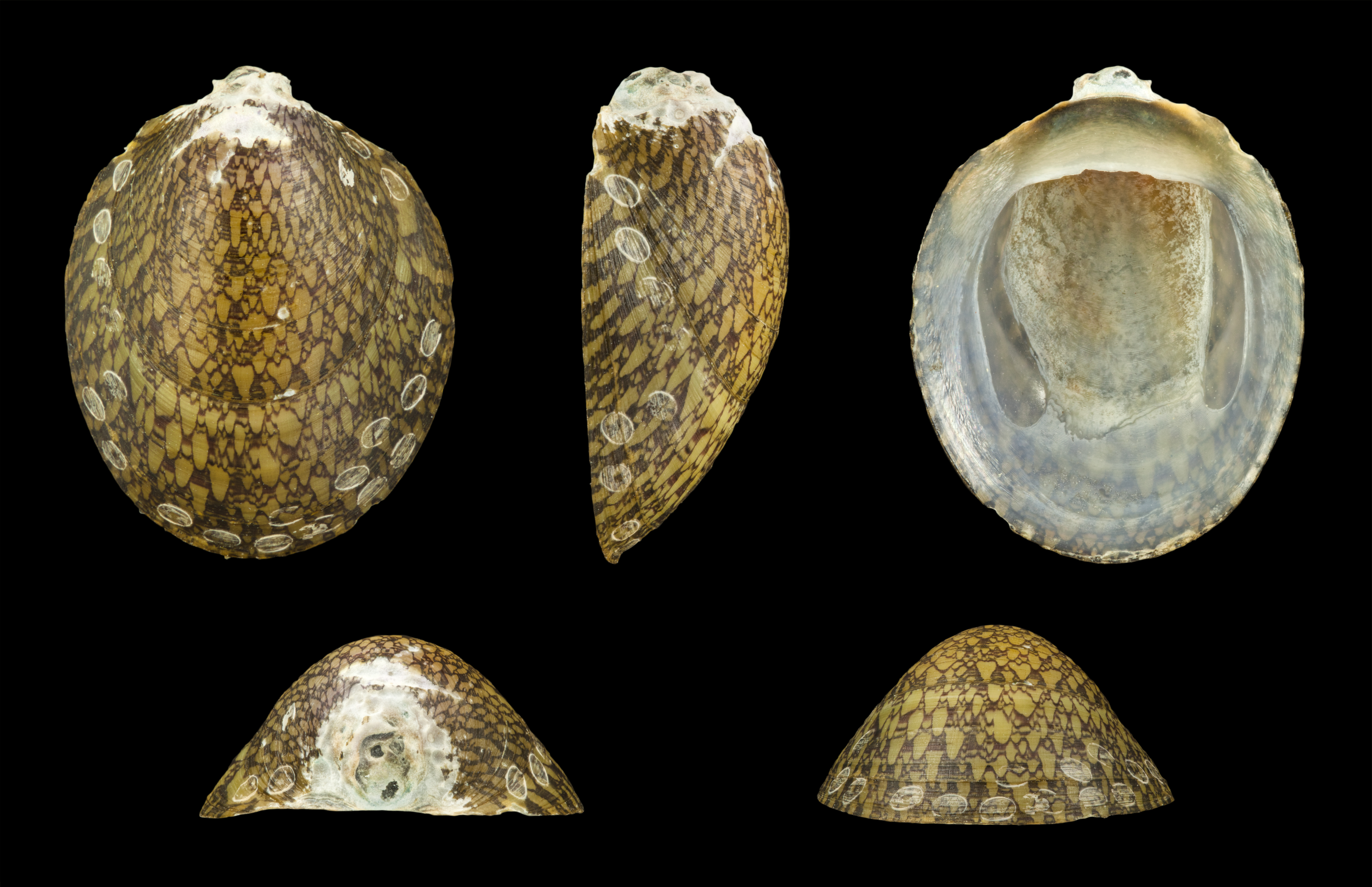
Septaria porcellana

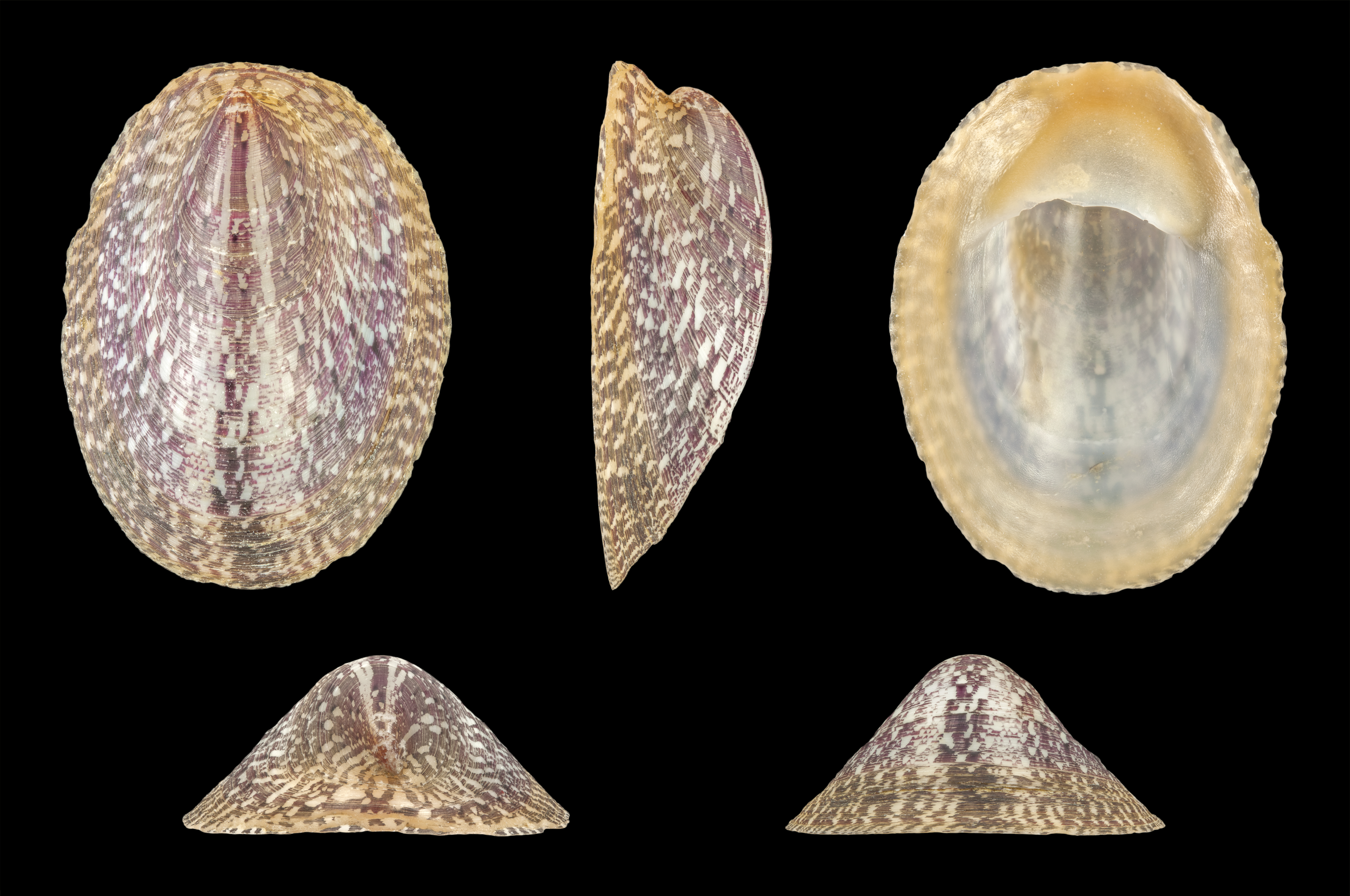
Septaria tesselata

Several additional species have been described, but are now considered synonyms.

Species brought into synonymy include

- Septaria borbonica (Saint-Vincent, 1803) - type species: synonym of Septaria porcellana borbonica (Bory de Saint-Vincent, 1804)
- Septaria haustrum (Reeve, 1856): synonym of Septaria porcellana borbonica (Bory de Saint-Vincent, 1804)
- Septaria suborbicularis (G. B. Sowerby I, 1825): synonym of Septaria porcellana (Linnaeus, 1758)
- Septaria suffreni (Récluz, 1841): synonym of Septaria freycineti Récluz, 1842
- Septaria taitana Mousson, 1869: synonym of Septaria tahitiana Eichhorst, 2016 (unavailable name: nomen nudum)
