= Turton High School =

Defunct school in South Dakota, United States

Information
- Established: 1915
- Closed: 1956
- Enrollment: 22 (1956)

Turton High School of Turton, South Dakota, operated from 1915 to 1956, when it was closed due to a shortage of funds, teachers and too few students to qualify for state aid. The 22 remaining students were bused to nearby Doland High School. The grade school remained open for several more years. The school's mascot was the frog, celebrating the French Canadian origins of many of the original settlers. The Turton High School building was torn down and the lumber was used to build the Turton Community Center.

Turton is located at 45°2′56″N 98°5′43″W (45.048943, -98.095402).

Turton District No. 34 became an independent school district in 1902. The teachers for the first two terms were Mrs. Read (Emeline Danner) Matheny and Read Matheny for 1902–1903. In the summer of 1911 the immediate need came for a high school. The district contracted for a second story to be added. Ferdinand LaBrie was paid $1,738 for construction and Arthur LaBrie was paid $35 for digging a new cellar for a larger furnace. The first graduates in 1915 were Myrtle Cloutier, Leo LaBrie and Alice Sondergard. The commencement exercises were held May 28, 1915 in the Turton Opera House, above the Steffes Garage. Between 1914 and 1918, Fred W. Fisher was employed as Superintendent and Janitor for an annual salary of $1,200. Miss Pearl Smith of Florence, SD, was the teacher. Subjects offered were four years of Latin, English, Math, History and Science. Sports were also introduced at this time. Mr. Fisher would challenge all with the gloves. School plays were supervised by Miss Smith.

== Bibliography ==
- "Items from the Past--44 years ago". Times Record. Turton, South Dakota. September 25, 2000.
- Turton All-School History 1890-1967
