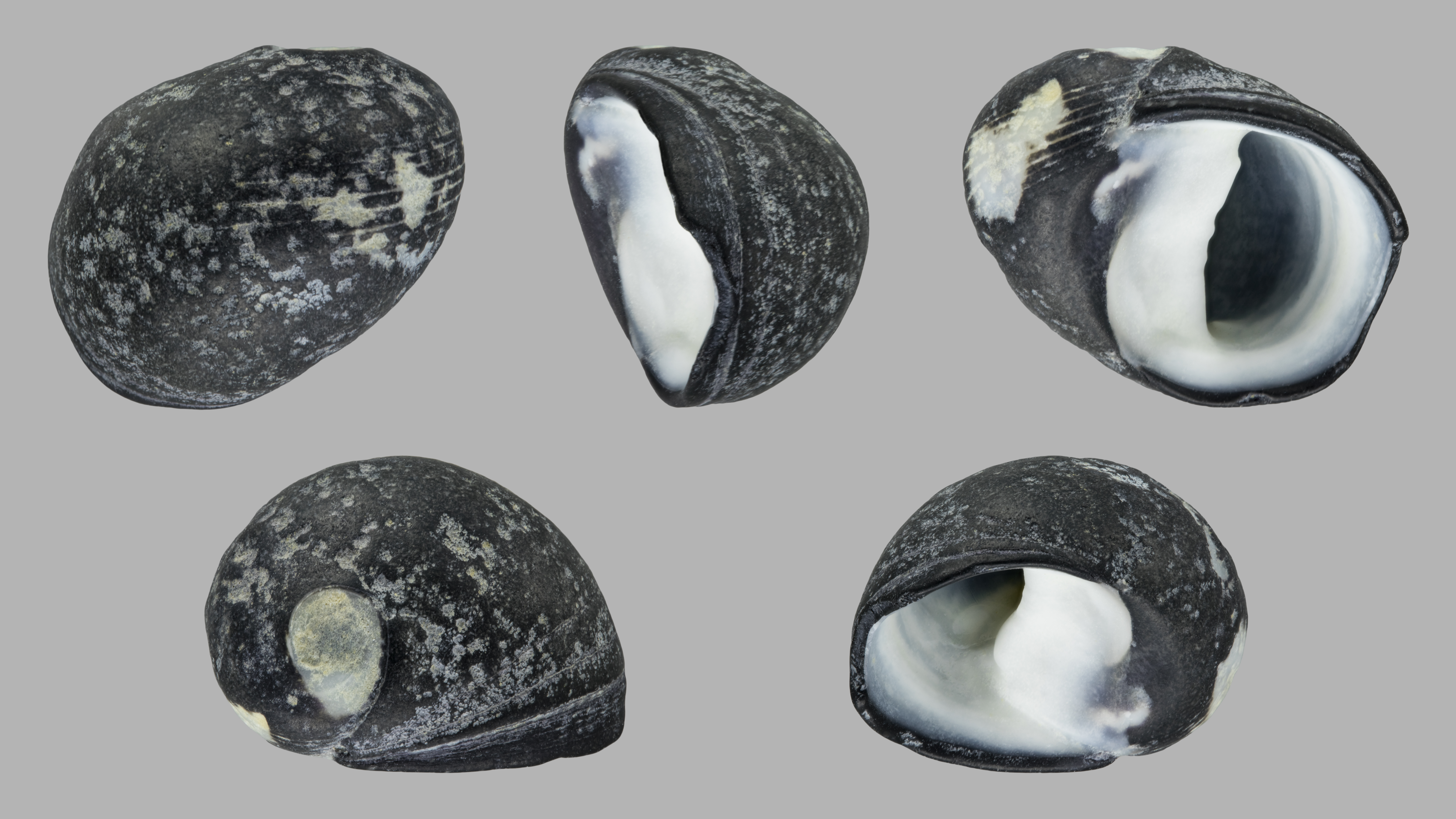
- A shell of Nerita melanotragus

Scientific classification
- Kingdom: Animalia
- Phylum: Mollusca
- Class: Gastropoda
- Order: Cycloneritida
- Family: Neritidae
- Genus: Nerita
- Species: N. melanotragus

Binomial name
- Nerita melanotragus E. A. Smith, 1884

= Nerita melanotragus =

Species of gastropod

Nerita melanotragus, common name black nerite, is a medium-sized sea snail, a marine gastropod mollusc in the family Neritidae, the nerites.

There has been some confusion over the taxonomy of the genus Nerita in the Pacific region, however Nerita atramentosa and Nerita melanotragus are now recognised as separate species (the two have often been considered to be the same species).

== Distribution ==
This nerite is endemic to the southern Pacific, including the south-eastern coast of Australia (Queensland, New South Wales, Victoria, Tasmania), Lord Howe Island, Norfolk Island, northern New Zealand and the Kermadec Islands.

== Habitat ==
This species is commonly found on intertidal rocks, particularly in the mid to upper intertidal zone. It prefers to attach to sloped or vertical rock surfaces, or hang from the underside of rocks. This may be a method of thermoregulation, because if N. melanotragus is on a horizontal surface, it would absorb the maximum solar radiation, whereas on sloped or vertical surfaces it absorbs less energy (and thus heat).

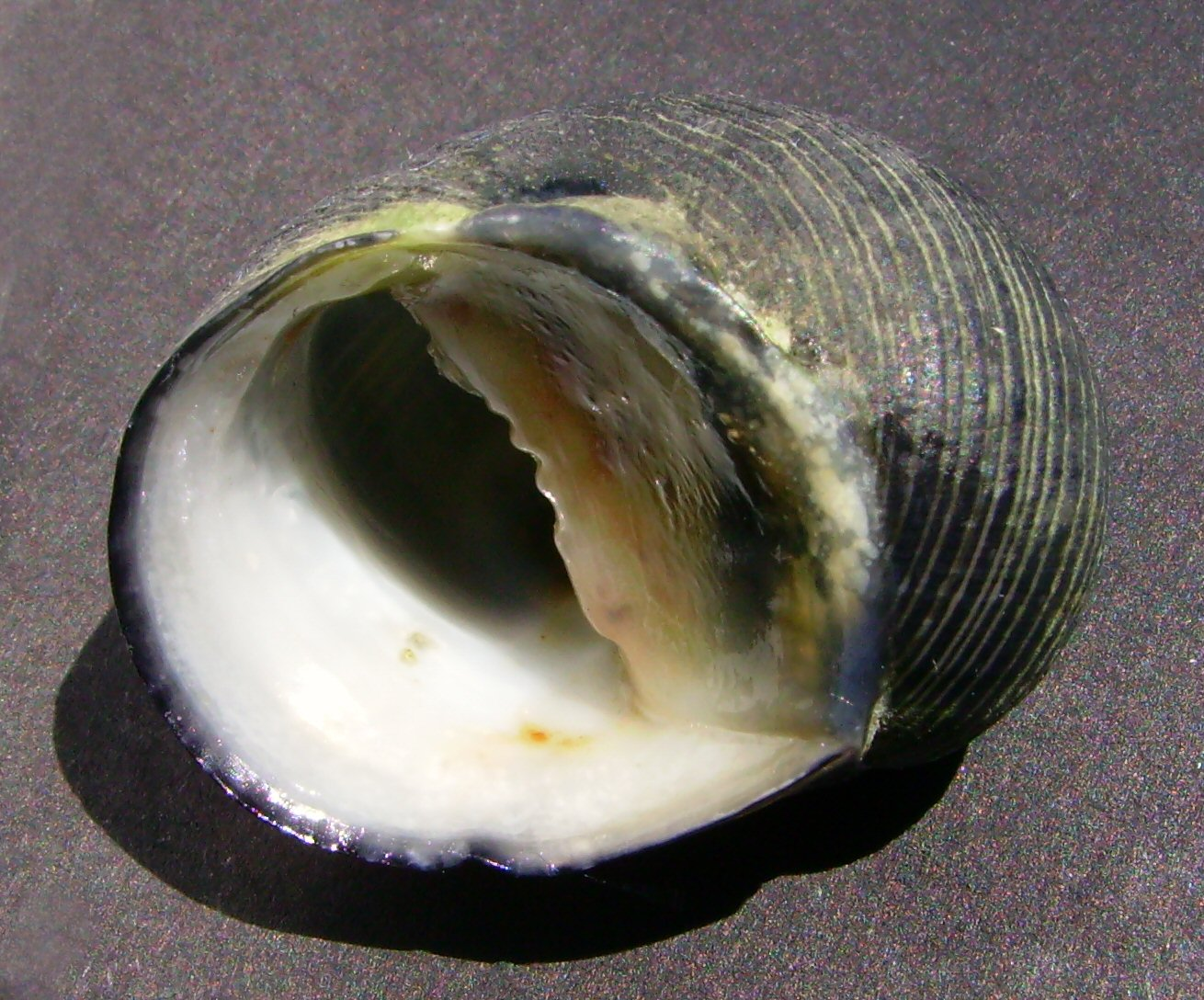
A shell of Nerita melanotragus, underside view

== Shell description ==
The shell is of moderate size, very solid, globose-oval, and smooth except for weak shallowly incised spiral lines. The external shell colour is black, but the aperture is white, except for a narrow black border. Once shells get over about 26mm they start to wear down and typically have knotched sides and a white wear on the right hand side of the shell.

The operculum is granular, pinkish-lilac, with two spiral bands of black.

The shell height is up to 30 mm, and width 32 mm.

== Genetics ==
An almost complete sequence of the mitochondrial DNA of this species was analyzed by Castro & Colgan (2010).
