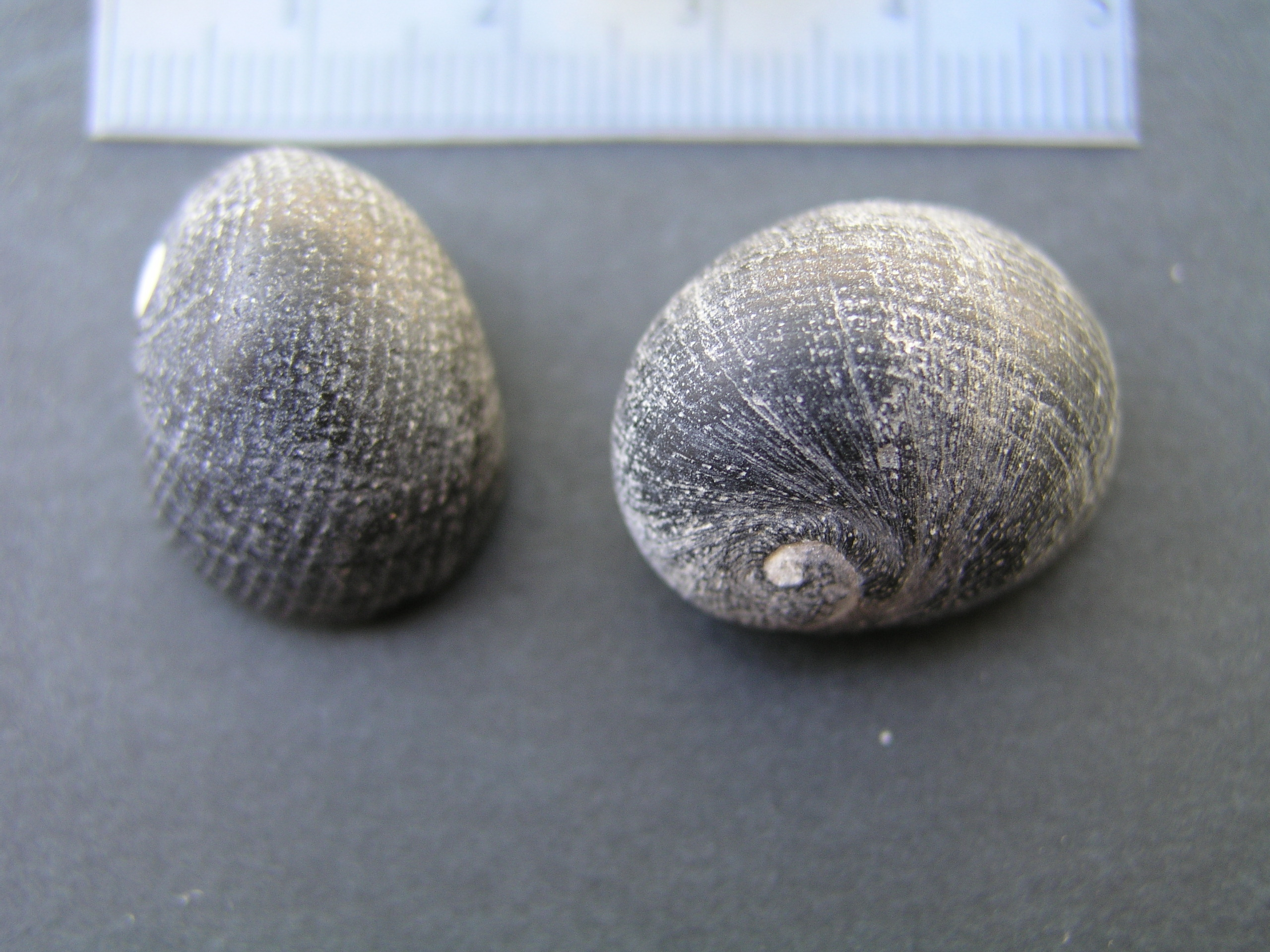

Scientific classification
- Kingdom: Animalia
- Phylum: Mollusca
- Class: Gastropoda
- Order: Cycloneritida
- Family: Neritidae
- Genus: Nerita
- Species: N. atramentosa

Binomial name
- Nerita atramentosa Reeve, 1855

= Nerita atramentosa =

Species of mollusc

Nerita atramentosa, common name the black nerite, is a medium-sized sea snail, a marine gastropod mollusc in the family Neritidae, the nerites.

There has been some confusion over the taxonomy of the genus Nerita in the Pacific region; however, Nerita atramentosa and Nerita melanotragus are now recognised as separate species (the two have often been considered to be the same species).

== Description ==
The black nerite shell is thick, black and speckled in white dots. It varies in lengths between 12 mm and 32 mm.

== Distribution ==
This nerite is endemic to the southern coastlands of Australia, including South Australia, southern Western Australia, Victoria and Tasmania. N. atramentosa occurs to the west of Wilsons Promontory in western Victoria, South Australia and southern Western Australia. The closely related species Nerita melanotragus occurs in eastern Victoria, New South Wales and Tasmania.

== Habitat ==
This species is commonly found on intertidal rocks, particularly in the mid to upper intertidal zone. It prefers to attach to sloped or vertical rock surfaces, or hang from the underside of rocks. This may be a method of thermoregulation, as if N. atramentosa is on a horizontal surface, it will absorb the maximum solar radiation. By contrast, if it is on a greater angle to the sun, it absorbs less energy (and thus heat). N. atramentosa exhibits trail following behaviour. The species feeds by scraping epilithic algae using their radula. Nerites are preyed upon by reef crabs (Ozius truncatus).

== Other sources ==
- Chilton, N. B; Bull, C. M. (1984). "Influence of predation by a crab on the distribution of the size-groups of three intertidal gastropods in South Australia". Marine Biology. 83 (2): 163–169. doi:10.1007/bf00394724. S2CID 85170940.
- Spencer, H.G.; Waters, J.M.; Eichhorst, T.E. (2007). "Taxonomy and nomenclature of black nerites (Gastropoda: Neritimorpha: Nerita) from the South Pacific". Invertebrate Systematics. 21 (3): 229–237. doi:10.1071/is06038.
