= Ashley Turton =

- Born: Elizabeth Ashley Westbrook; November 25, 1973; Greensboro, North Carolina
- Died: January 10, 2011 (aged 37); Washington, DC
- Occupations: lobbyist, political staffer

Ashley Turton (November 25, 1973 – January 10, 2011) was a lobbyist for Progress Energy who was reportedly "likely involved with" the company's merger with Duke Energy. She had been Special Assistant to Speaker of the House Nancy Pelosi, chief of staff for Connecticut representative Rosa DeLauro and before that, aide to Missouri representative Dick Gephardt. She was married to Dan Turton, the Obama administration's liaison to the House of Representatives. They had three children.

On the morning of January 10, 2011 she had planned to drive to the airport for an air trip related to her work. Instead, a neighbor telephoned at 4:49 a.m. to report Turton's garage was on fire. Inside the garage, firefighters discovered her body in her 2008 BMW X5 SUV. Her death was investigated by the Metropolitan Police Department with assistance from the city fire department, two BMW engineers, and the ATF. The coroner's report found “acute alcohol intoxication” and said she died from “inhalation of products of combustion and thermal burns”. According to authorities, there was no indication of foul play and there were "no obvious signs of trauma".
