= Turton, South Dakota =

- Town
- Location in Spink County and the state of South Dakota
- Coordinates: 45°02′56″N 98°05′51″W
- Country: United States
- State: South Dakota
- County: Spink
- Incorporated: 1905

Area
  - Total: 0.37 sq mi (0.95 km^{2})
  - Land: 0.37 sq mi (0.95 km^{2})
  - Water: 0 sq mi (0.00 km^{2})
- Elevation: 1,329 ft (405 m)

Population (2020)
  - Total: 55
  - Density: 150/sq mi (57.9/km^{2})
- Time zone: UTC-6 (Central (CST))
  - Summer (DST): UTC-5 (CDT)
- ZIP code: 57477
- Area code: 605
- FIPS code: 46-64540
- GNIS feature ID: 1267606

Turton is a town in Spink County, South Dakota, United States. The population was 55 at the 2020 census. The town was served by Turton High School from 1915 to 1956; students attended Doland High School thereafter.

== History ==
Turton was platted in 1886. It was named after Turton, England, the native home of an early settler. An early variant name was St. Paul. A post office has been in operation in Turton since 1887.

== Geography ==
According to the United States Census Bureau, the town has a total area of 0.37 square miles (0.96 km^{2}), all land.

== Demographics ==
Historical population
Census	Pop.	Note	%±
1910	240		—
1920	243		1.3%
1930	323		32.9%
1940	180		−44.3%
1950	201		11.7%
1960	140		−30.3%
1970	121		−13.6%
1980	101		−16.5%
1990	76		−24.8%
2000	61		−19.7%
2010	48		−21.3%
2020	55		14.6%
U.S. Decennial Census

=== 2010 census ===
As of the census of 2010, there were 48 people, 26 households, and 13 families residing in the town. The population density was 129.7 inhabitants per square mile (50.1/km^{2}). There were 45 housing units at an average density of 121.6 per square mile (47.0/km^{2}). The racial makeup of the town was 100.0% White.

There were 26 households, of which 11.5% had children under the age of 18 living with them, 50.0% were married couples living together, and 50.0% were non-families. 46.2% of all households were made up of individuals, and 30.7% had someone living alone who was 65 years of age or older. The average household size was 1.85 and the average family size was 2.62.

The median age in the town was 53.5 years. 10.4% of residents were under the age of 18; 6.4% were between the ages of 18 and 24; 10.5% were from 25 to 44; 45.9% were from 45 to 64; and 27.1% were 65 years of age or older. The gender makeup of the town was 56.3% male and 43.8% female.

=== 2000 census ===
As of the census of 2000, there were 61 people, 34 households, and 17 families residing in the town. The population density was 167.0 inhabitants per square mile (64.5/km^{2}). There were 47 housing units at an average density of 128.7 per square mile (49.7/km^{2}). The racial makeup of the town was 100.00% White.

There were 34 households, out of which 8.8% had children under the age of 18 living with them, 47.1% were married couples living together, 2.9% had a female householder with no husband present, and 50.0% were non-families. 44.1% of all households were made up of individuals, and 29.4% had someone living alone who was 65 years of age or older. The average household size was 1.79 and the average family size was 2.47.

In the town, the population was spread out, with 11.5% under the age of 18, 1.6% from 18 to 24, 16.4% from 25 to 44, 27.9% from 45 to 64, and 42.6% who were 65 years of age or older. The median age was 59 years. For every 100 females, there were 90.6 males. For every 100 females age 18 and over, there were 107.7 males.

The median income for a household in the town was $23,929, and the median income for a family was $36,250. Males had a median income of $56,250 versus $16,250 for females. The per capita income for the town was $18,519. There were no families and 4.7% of the population living below the poverty line, including no under eighteens and 3.7% of those over 64.
