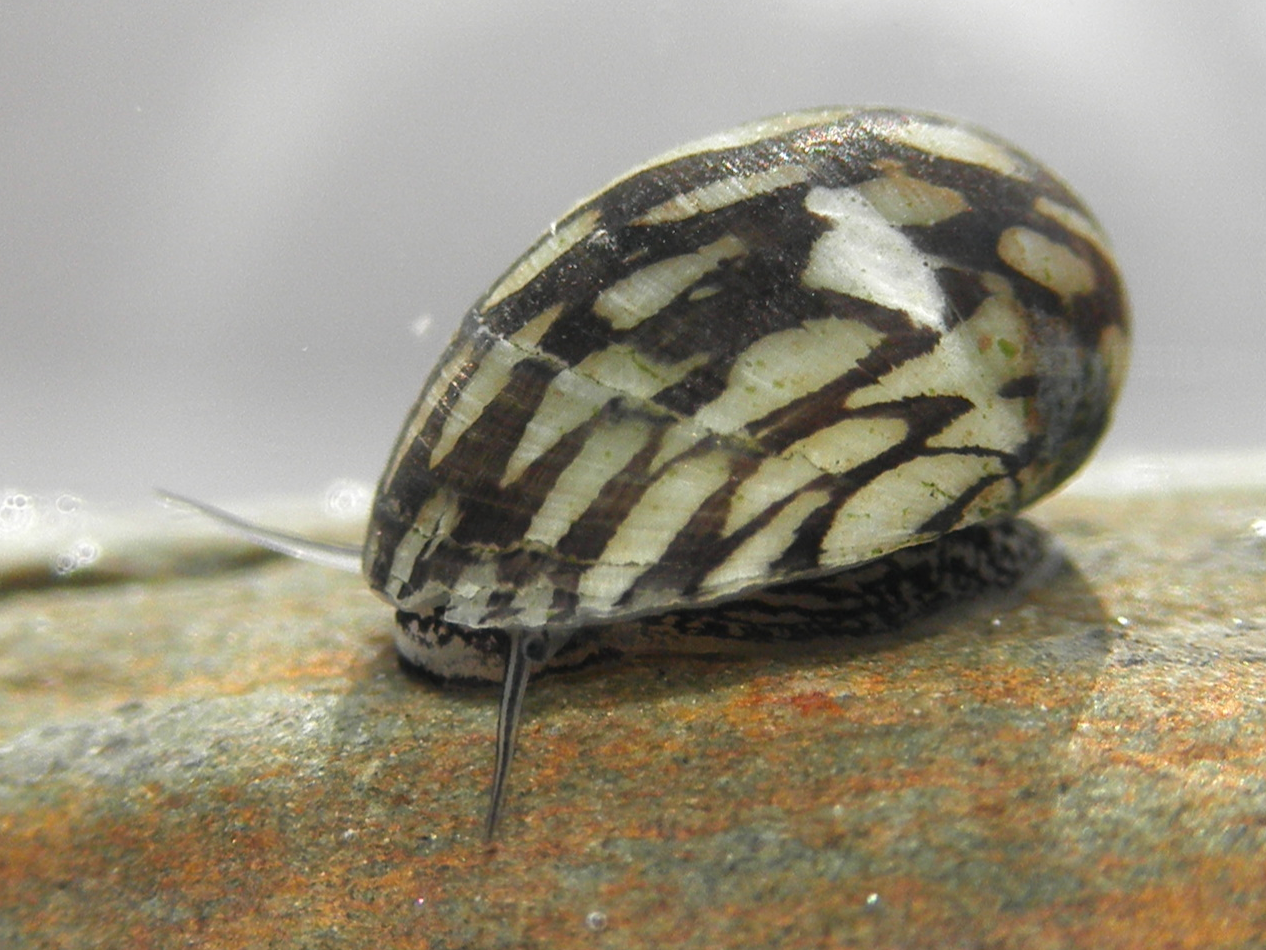
- An oblique left side view of a live Theodoxus fluviatilis
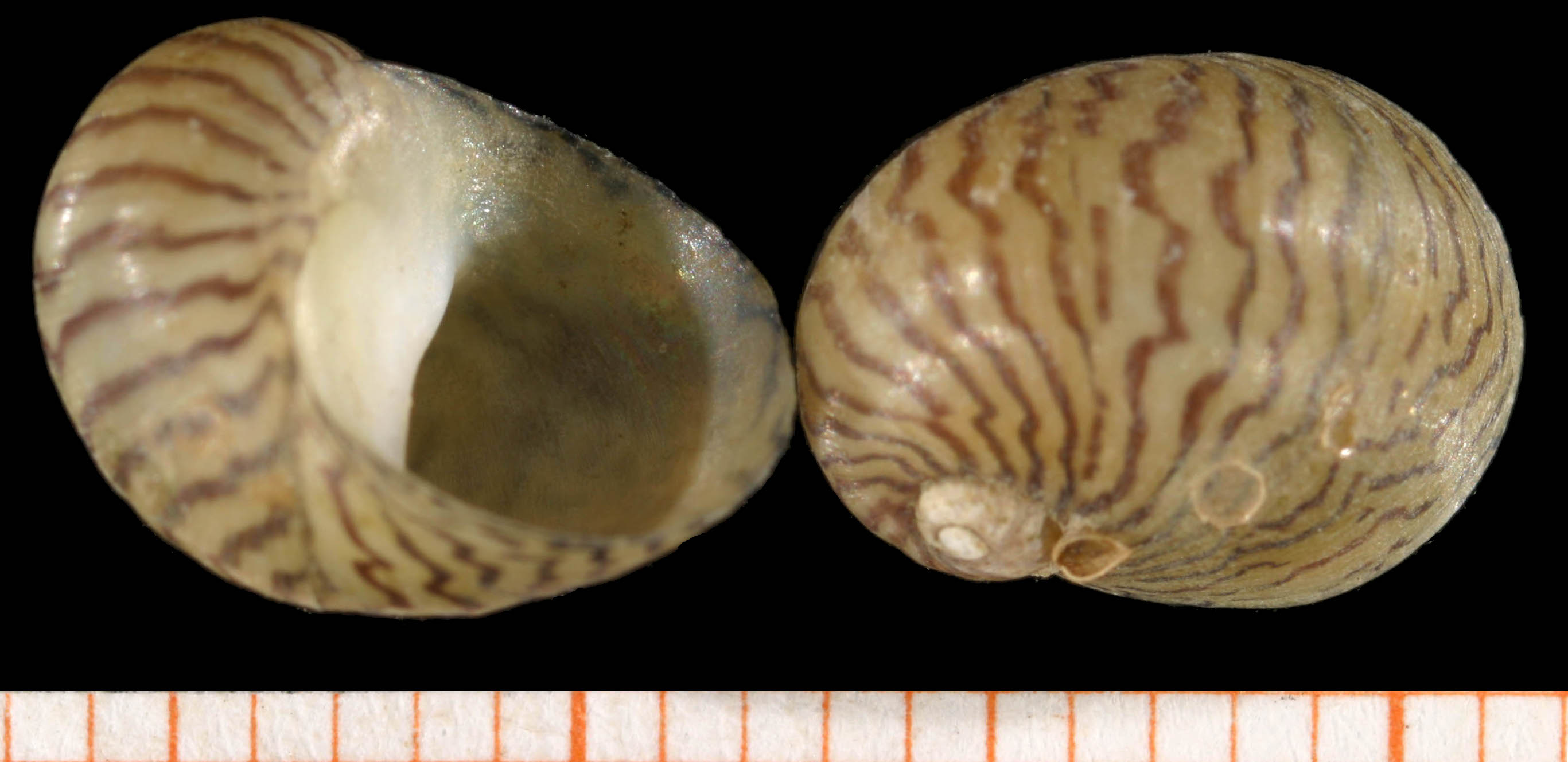
- Two shells of the freshwater nerite Theodoxus danubialis, scale bar in mm

Scientific classification
- Kingdom: Animalia
- Phylum: Mollusca
- Class: Gastropoda
- Subclass: Neritimorpha
- Order: Cycloneritida
- Superfamily: Neritoidea
- Family: Neritidae; Rafinesque, 1815

Genera
- See text

Diversity
- About 110 freshwater species, some brackish water species, and some fully marine species

= Neritidae =

Family of gastropods

Neritidae, common name the nerites, is a family of small to medium-sized sea and freshwater snails which have a gill and a distinctive operculum. The family Neritidae includes marine genera such as Nerita, marine and freshwater genera such as Neritina, and freshwater and brackish water genera such as Theodoxus.

The common name "nerite" as well as the family name Neritidae and the genus name Nerita, are derived from the name of Nerites, who was a sea god in Greek mythology.

== Distribution ==
Neritidae live primarily in the southern hemisphere, but there are some exceptions, such as a genus Theodoxus which can be found in Europe and Northern Africa or Bathynerita naticoidea.

== Taxonomy ==
This family consists of the five following subfamilies (according to the taxonomy of the Gastropoda by Bouchet & Rocroi, 2005):

- Neritinae Rafinesque, 1815 - synonyms: Neritellinae Gray, 1847; Proto neritidae Kittl, 1899
- † Neritariinae Wenz, 1938
- Neritininae Poey, 1852
  - tribe Neritinini Poey, 1852 - synonyms: Catilinae Gray, 1868; Orthopomatini Gray, 1868; Stenopomatini Gray, 1868; Septariini Jousseaume, 1894
  - tribe Theodoxini Bandel, 2001
- Smaragdiinae H. B. Baker, 1923
- † Velatinae Bandel, 2001

== Genera ==
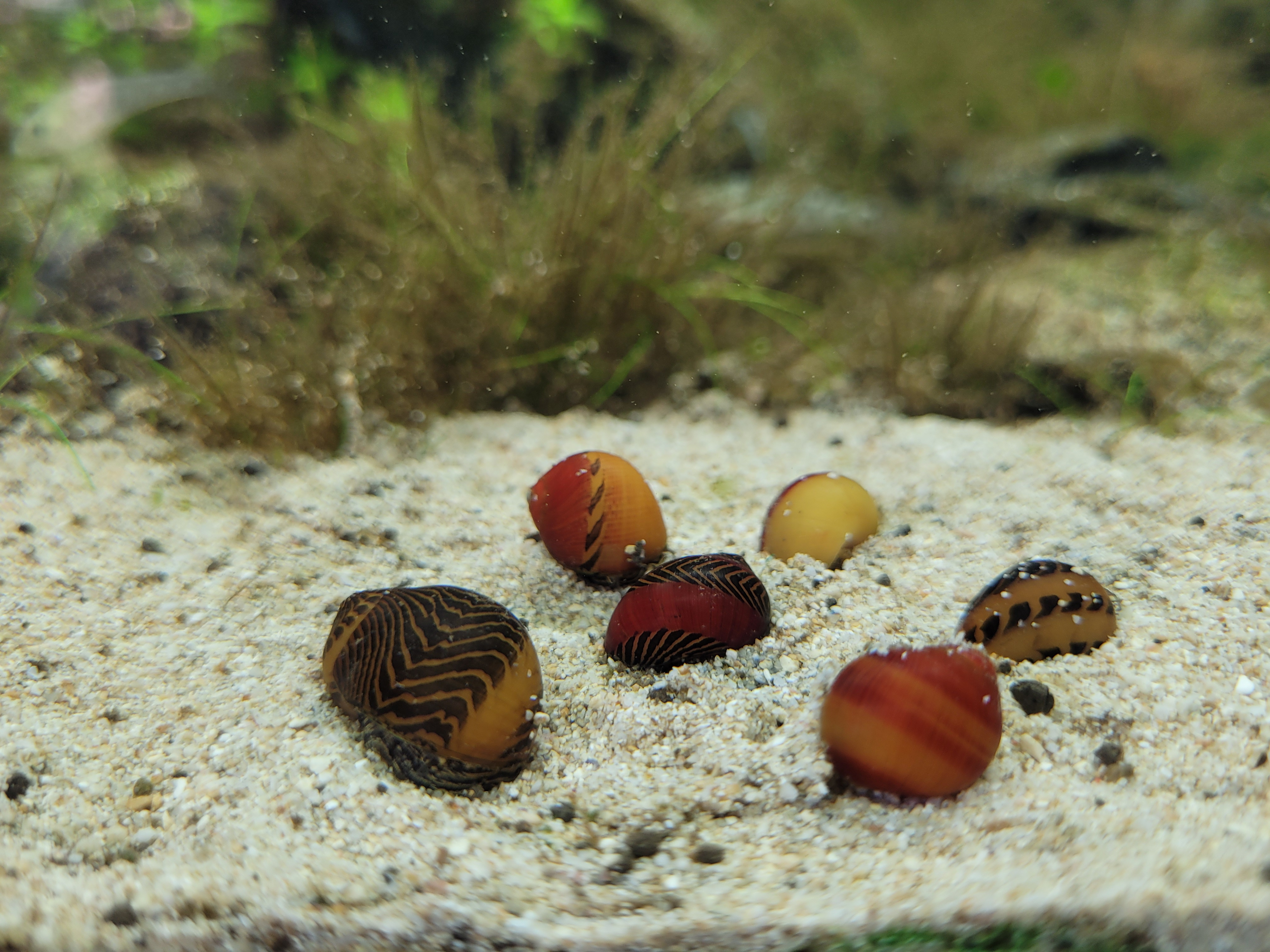
Red racer nerites, Vittina waigiensis, from the Philippines. These are popular in the aquarium trade for their extremely variable shell patterns

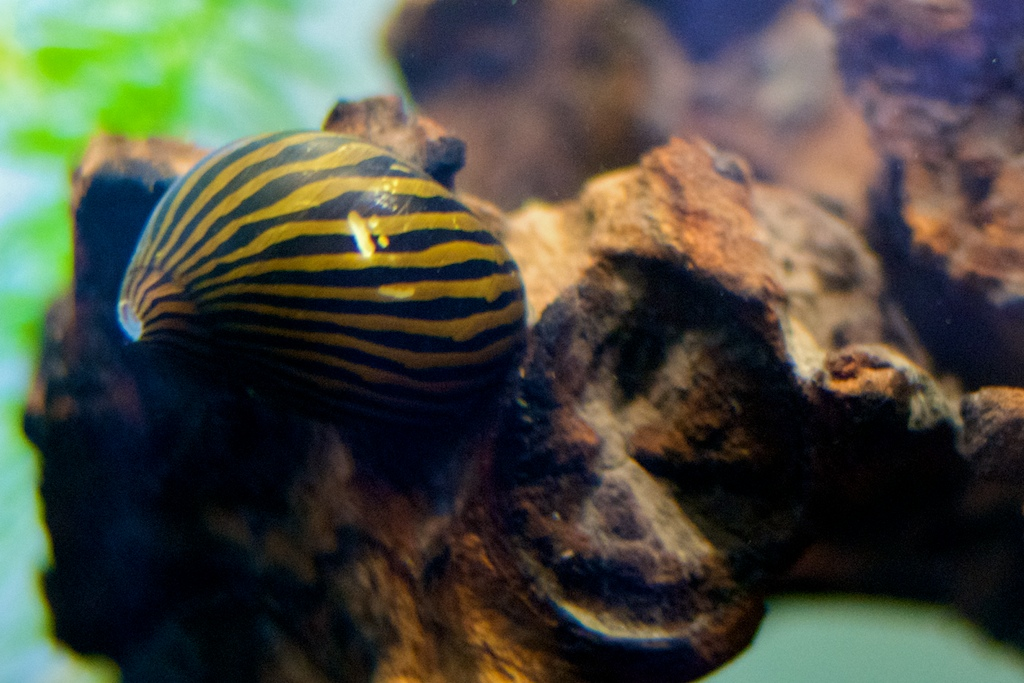
The zebra nerite, Vittina natalensis, from East Africa. A common nerite snail in the aquarium trade and one of several species known as "zebra nerites"

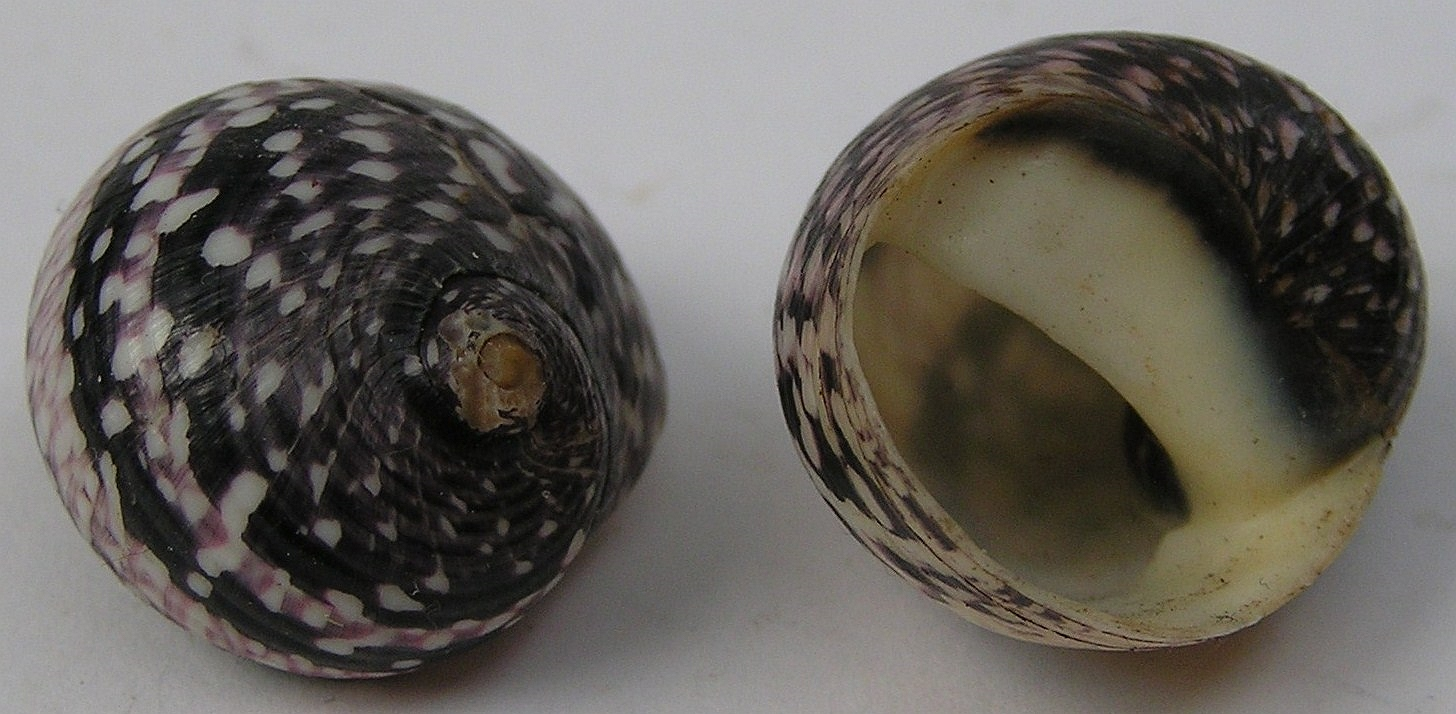
Two shells of Neritodryas cornea

Genera, subgenera and species within the family Neritidae include:

- † Bajanerita Squires, 1993
- † Calyptronerita Le Renard, 1980
- † Cuisenerita Symonds & Pacaud, 2010
- † Mesoneritina Yen, 1946
- † Monsneritina Kowalke, 2002

Subfamily Neritinae

- Genus Bathynerita Clarke, 1989
- Genus Mienerita Dekker, 2000
- Genus Nerita Linnaeus, 1758 - type genus, synonyms: Turrita Wagner, 1897
  - Subgenus Adenerita
  - Subgenus Amphinerita
  - Subgenus Cymostyla
  - Subgenus Heminerita
  - Subgenus Ilynerita
  - Subgenus Linnerita
  - Subgenus Melanerita Martens, 1889
    - Species Nerita atramentosa Reeve, 1855
    - Species Nerita melanotragus Smith, E. A., 1884
  - Subgenus Nerita
  - Subgenus Ritena
  - Subgenus Theliostyla

Subfamily † Neritariinae

- † Neritaria Koken, 1892

Subfamily Neritininae

- Clithon Montfort, 1810
- Clypeolum Récluz, 1842
- Fluvinerita Pilsbry, 1932
  - Fluvinerita tenebricosa
- † Manana Gabuniya, 1949
- † Mananopsis Gabuniya, 1949
- Nereina de Cristofori & Jan, 1832
- Neripteron Lesson, 1831
  - Neripteron vespertinum (Sowerby II, 1849)
- Neritina Rafinesque, 1815
  - Subgenus Dostia
- † Neritinopsis Gabuniya, 1953
- Neritodryas Martens, 1869
- Neritona Martens, 1869
- † Neritoplica Oppenheim, 1892
- Puperita Gray, 1857
- Septaria Férussac, 1807
- † Superior Francois, 1953
- Theodoxus Montfort, 1810
- † Velatella Meek, 1873
- Vitta Mörch, 1852
- Vittina H. B. Baker, 1923

Subfamily Smaragdiinae

- Genus Gaillardotia Bourguignat, 1877
- Genus Magadis Melvill & Standen, 1899
- Genus Smaragdella Baker, 1923
- Genus Smaragdia Issel, 1869
- Genus Smaragoista

Subfamily † Velatinae

- † Velates Montfort, 1810

== Synonyms ==
- † Agapilia Harzhauser & Kowalke, 2001 : synonym of Vitta Mörch, 1852
- Navicella Lamarck, 1816: synonym of Septaria Férussac, 1807 (junior synonym)
- † Ninniopsis Tomlin, 1930: synonym of † Theodoxus (Ninniopsis) Tomlin, 1930 represented as Theodoxus Montfort, 1810 (original rank)
- Orthopoma Gray, 1868: synonym of Septaria Férussac, 1807
- Orthopomatini Gray, 1868: synonym of Neritininae Poey, 1852
- Paranerita Bourne, 1908: synonym of Vittina H. B. Baker, 1923 (Invalid: junior homonym of Paranerita Hampson, 1901 [Lepidoptera])
- Pseudonerita H. B. Baker, 1923: synonym of Neripteron (Pseudonerita) H. B. Baker, 1923 represented as Neripteron Lesson, 1831
- Serenia Benson, 1856: synonym of Neritona Martens, 1869 (unavailable name: established in synonymy)
- Tanalia Gray, 1847: synonym of Neritona Martens, 1869
- Theodoxia Bourguignat, 1877: synonym of Theodoxus Montfort, 1810 (Invalid: unjustified emendation of Theodoxus)
- Theodoxis Montfort, 1810: synonym of Theodoxus Montfort, 1810 (alternative original spelling, not in use)
