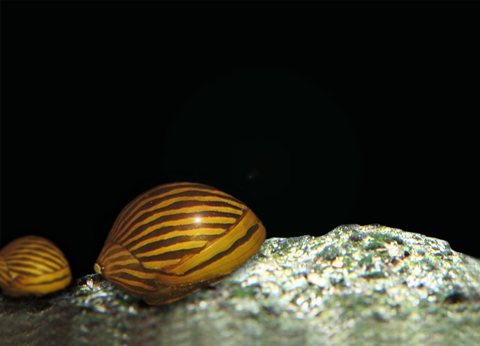
- Two live individuals of Neritina natalensis

Scientific classification
- Kingdom: Animalia
- Phylum: Mollusca
- Class: Gastropoda
- Order: Cycloneritida
- Superfamily: Neritoidea
- Family: Neritidae
- Genus: Neritina; Rafinesque, 1815

Type species
- Nerita pulligera Linnaeus, 1767

Synonyms
- Nerita (Neritina) Lamarck, 1816; Neritella Gray, 1847; Neritina (Neritella) Gray, 1847; Neritina (Neritina) Lamarck, 1816 (a junior synonym)

= Neritina =

Genus of gastropods

Neritina (common name: nerite snails), is a genus of small aquatic snails with an operculum in the family Neritidae, the nerites. They are as well marine, brackish water, and sometimes freshwater gastropod mollusks.

Neritina is the type genus of the tribe Neritinini.

== Species ==
Species in the genus Neritina include:

- † Neritina aloeodus F. Sandberger, 1860
- † Neritina ambrosana Stephenson in Stephenson & Stenzel, 1952
- Neritina arcifer Mörch, 1872
- Neritina asperulata (Récluz, 1843)
- † Neritina bannisteri Meek, 1873
- † Neritina baptista White, 1878
- † Neritina baueri Stanton, 1916
- Neritina beckii (Récluz, 1841)
- † Neritina bellatula Meek, 1873
- † Neritina bidens F. Sandberger, 1870
- † Neritina brevispira F. Sandberger, 1871
- † Neritina brongnartina Matheron, 1843
- † Neritina bruneri White, 1882
- Neritina canalis G. B. Sowerby I, 1825
- † Neritina carditoides Meek, 1873
- Neritina cenomanensis Repelin, 1902
- Neritina cornuta Reeve, 1856
- † Neritina disparilis Vincent, 1930
- † Neritina edentula Dall, 1892
- † Neritina elephantina Wesselingh, 2003
- † Neritina etheridgei Roxo, 1924
- Neritina exclamationis Mabille, 1895
- † Neritina fischeri Brunner, 1848
- † † Neritina fulminifera F. Sandberger, 1861
- † Neritina gentili Pallary, 1901
- Neritina hamuligera Troschel, 1837
- † Neritina headonensis (Symonds, 2006)
- † Neritina hoeseltensis (Marquet et al., 2008)
- Neritina immersa E. von Martens, 1861
- † Neritina inequidentata Recluz, 1850
- † Neritina inornata F. Sandberger, 1870
- † Neritina insolita Stephenson in Stephenson & Stenzel, 1952
- Neritina iris Mousson, 1849
- Neritina janetabbasae Eichhorst, 2016
- Neritina knorri (Récluz, 1841)
- † Neritina lautricensis (Noulet, 1857)
- † Neritina levesquei Récluz, 1850
- † Neritina linthae (Locard, 1893)
- † Neritina lutea Zittel, 1863
- † Neritina malescoti Vasseur, 1882
- † Neritina mariae Handmann, 1887
- † Neritina maxwellorum Beu & B. A. Marshall, 2011
- † Neritina narbonensis (Noulet, 1858)
- † Neritina ortoni Woodward, 1871
- † Neritina pacchiana Palmer, 1941
- † Neritina pachyderma Sandberger, 1875
- † Neritina patricknuttalli Wesselingh, 2003
- Neritina petitii (Récluz, 1841)
- † Neritina philippsoni Oppenheim, 1894
- † Neritina pilisensis (Báldi, 1973)
- Neritina porcata A. Gould, 1847
- Neritina powisiana (Récluz, 1843)
- † Neritina primordialis Repelin, 1902
- Neritina pulligera (Linnaeus, 1767) - type species
- † Neritina puncta Etheridge, 1879
- † Neritina roxoi de Greve, 1938
- † Neritina sanctifelicis Doncieux, 1908
- Neritina sandalina (Récluz, 1842)
- Neritina sanguinea G. B. Sowerby II, 1849
- Neritina squamaepicta (Récluz, 1843)
- † Neritina squamulifera Sandberger, 1872
- † Neritina staffinensis Forbes, 1851
- Neritina stumpffi Boettger, 1890
- † Neritina subangularis Sandberger, 1860
- † Neritina supraoligocaenica (Báldi, 1973)
- Neritina tingitana Pallary, 1899 (taxon inquirendum)
- Neritina turbida Morelet, 1849 (taxon inquirednum)
- † Neritina veldiensis (Roemer, 1839)
- † Neritina vetranici (Brusina, 1902)
- † Neritina volvilineata White, 1876
- Neritina zigzag Lamarck, 1822

== Species brought into synonymy ==
- Neritina adansoniana (Récluz, 1841): synonym of Vitta adansoniana (Récluz, 1841) (new combination)
- Neritina afra G.B. Sowerby I, 1841: synonym of Nereina afra (G. B. Sowerby I, 1836) (original combination)
- Neritina anatolica (Récluz, 1841): synonym of Theodoxus anatolicus (Récluz, 1841) (superseded combination)
- Neritina cariosa (Wood, 1828): synonym of Neripteron cariosum (W. Wood, 1828)
- Neritina clenchi Russell, 1940: synonym of Vitta clenchi (Russell, 1940) (new combination)
- Neritina comorensis Morelet, 1877: synonym of Clithon chlorostoma (G. B. Sowerby I, 1833)
- Neritina consimilis Martens, 1879: synonym of Neritilia rubida (Pease, 1865)
- Neritina cornucopia Benson, 1836: synonym of Neripteron cornucopia (Benson, 1836)
- Neritina cristata Morelet, 1864: synonym of Vitta cristata (Morelet, 1864)
- Neritina euphratica Mousson, 1874: synonym of Theodoxus jordani (Sowerby I, 1836)
- Neritina flexuosa Hombron & Jacquinot, 1848: synonym of Clithon corona (Linnaeus, 1758)
- Neritina flexuosa Gassies, 1878: synonym of Clithon nouletianus (Gassies, 1863)
- Neritina gagates (Lamarck, 1822): synonym of Vittina gagates (Lamarck, 1822)
- Neritina glabrata Sowerby, 1849: synonym of Vitta glabrata (G. B. Sowerby II, 1849)
- Neritina granosa G.B. Sowerby I, 1825: synonym of Neritona granosa (G. B. Sowerby I, 1825)
- Neritina hellvillensis Crosse, 1881: synonym of Smaragdia souverbiana (Montrouzier, 1863)
- Neritina horrida Mabille, 1895: synonym of Clithon diadema (Récluz, 1841)
- Neritina juttingae (Mienis, 1973) - hedgehog nerite: synonym of Neritona juttingae (Mienis, 1973)
- Neritina kuramoensis Yoloye & Adegoke, 1977: synonym of Vitta kuramoensis (Yoloye & Adegoke, 1977)
- Neritina manoeli (Dohrn, 1866): synonym of Neritilia manoeli (Dohrn, 1866)
- Neritina mauriciae (Lesson, 1831): synonym of Neripteron mauriciae (Lesson, 1831)
- Neritina mauritiana Morelet, 1867: synonym of Clithon coronatum (Leach, 1815)
- Neritina meleagris (Lamarck, 1822): synonym of Vitta meleagris (Lamarck, 1822)
- Neritina natalensis Reeve, 1855: synonym of Vittina natalensis (Reeve, 1855)
- Neritina nouletiana Gassies, 1863: synonym of Clithon nouletianus (Gassies, 1863)
- Neritina oweniana (Wood, 1828): synonym of Clypeolum owenianum (W. Wood, 1828)
- Neritina perfecta Mabille, 1895: synonym of Clithon bicolor (Récluz, 1843)
- Neritina piratica Russell, 1940: synonym of Vitta piratica (Russell, 1940)
- Neritina ponsoti Pallary, 1930: synonym of Theodoxus jordani (G. B. Sowerby I, 1836)
- Neritina pulcherrima Angas, 1871: synonym of Smaragdia souverbiana (Montrouzier, 1863)
- Neritina punctulata Lamarck, 1816: synonym of Nereina punctulata (Lamarck, 1816)
- Neritina pusilla C.B. Adams, 1850: synonym of Neritilia pusilla (C.B. Adams, 1850)
- Neritina pygmaea C.B. Adams, 1845: synonym of Neritilia succinea (Récluz, 1841)
- Neritina rangiana Récluz, 1841: synonym of Smaragdia rangiana (Recluz, 1841)
- Neritina reclivata (Say, 1822) - olive nerite: synonym of Neritina usnea (Röding, 1798): synonym of Vitta usnea (Röding, 1798)
- Neritina retusa Morelet, 1853: synonym of Clithon bicolor (Récluz, 1843)
- Neritina rubida Pease, 1865: synonym of Neritilia rubida (Pease, 1865)
- Neritina rubricata Morelet, 1858: synonym of Vitta rubricata (Morelet, 1858)
- Neritina souverbieana Montrouzier, 1863: synonym of Smaragdia souverbiana (Montrouzier, 1863)
- Neritina tiassalensis Binder, 1955: synonym of Clypeolum owenianum (W. Wood, 1828)
- Neritina turrita (Gmelin, 1791): synonym of Vittina turrita (Gmelin, 1791)
- Neritina unidentata Récluz, 1850: synonym of Clithon corona (Linnaeus, 1758)
- Neritina usnea (Roding, 1798) - olive nerite: synonym of Vitta usnea (Röding, 1798)
- Neritina violacea (Gmelin, 1791): synonym of Neripteron violaceum (Gmelin, 1791)
- Neritina virginea (Linnaeus, 1758) - virgin nerite: synonym of Vitta virginea (Linnaeus, 1758)
- Neritina zebra (Bruguière, 1792): synonym of Vitta zebra (Bruguière, 1792)
