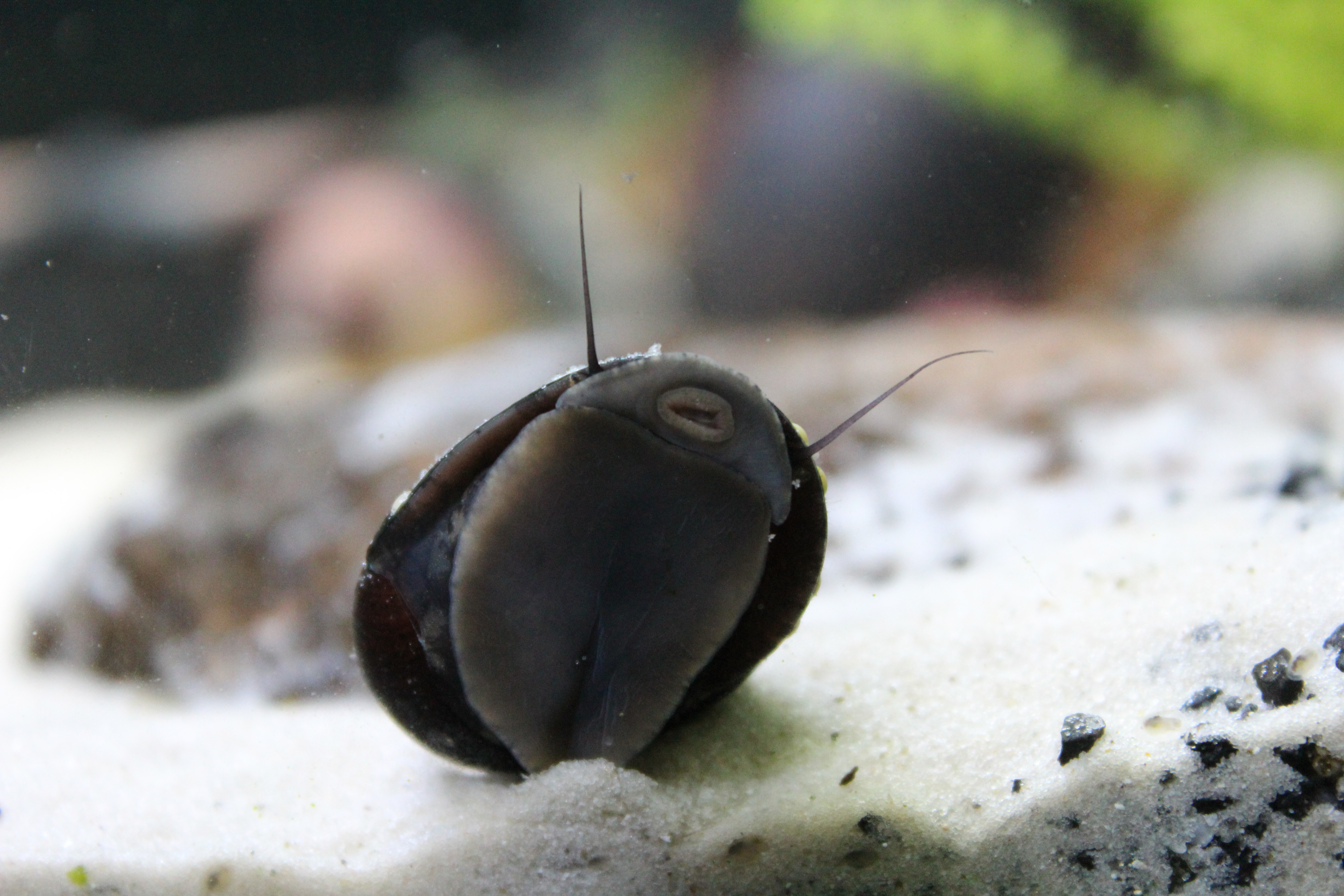
- A live specimen of Neritina pulligera

Conservation status
- Least Concern (IUCN 3.1)

Scientific classification
- Kingdom: Animalia
- Phylum: Mollusca
- Class: Gastropoda
- Order: Cycloneritida
- Family: Neritidae
- Genus: Neritina
- Species: N. pulligera

Binomial name
- Neritina pulligera (Linnaeus, 1767)

Synonyms
- Nerita rossmassleriana Récluz, 1846; Nerita rubella O. F. Müller, 1774; Neritina brandtii R. A. Philippi, 1849; Neritina bruguieri G. B. Sowerby II, 1849; Neritina larga Hombron & Jacquinot, 1848; Neritina subcanalis Mousson, 1865

= Neritina pulligera =

Species of freshwater snail

Neritina pulligera, also known as dusky nerite, black racer, black helmet snail, or steel helmet snail, is a species of freshwater snail of the family Neritidae. Its shell is olive-green to black, typically 20–26 mm (0.79–1.0 in) long, and covers almost the snail's entire body. N. pulligera has an operculum, a "trapdoor" used by the snail to close its shell. Females have a specialised organ (the crystal or reinforcement sac) which stores solid material used to produce a hardened egg capsule. N. pulligera was first described in 1767 by Carl Linnaeus and is the type species (reference species) of the genus Neritina.

N. pulligera is native across the Indo-west Pacific. Despite being sold worldwide as part of the aquarium trade, it has not been recorded outside of its native range as of 2023. The species lives in fast-flowing streams and rivers. Females attach their eggs on the shells of other living snails, which reduces the risk of predation by other snails. Like other neritids, larvae of N. pulligera drift downstream to the sea and juveniles migrate back upstream to reproduce. During this migration, they often carry juveniles of the smaller Neritina asperulata, which "hitchhike" on N. pulligera to save energy. N. pulligera is a popular ornamental species in aquariums and often introduced to combat algae growth. Since juveniles do not develop in fresh water, all traded individuals are wild caught, which raises concerns about impacts of the practice on local N. pulligera populations.

== Description ==
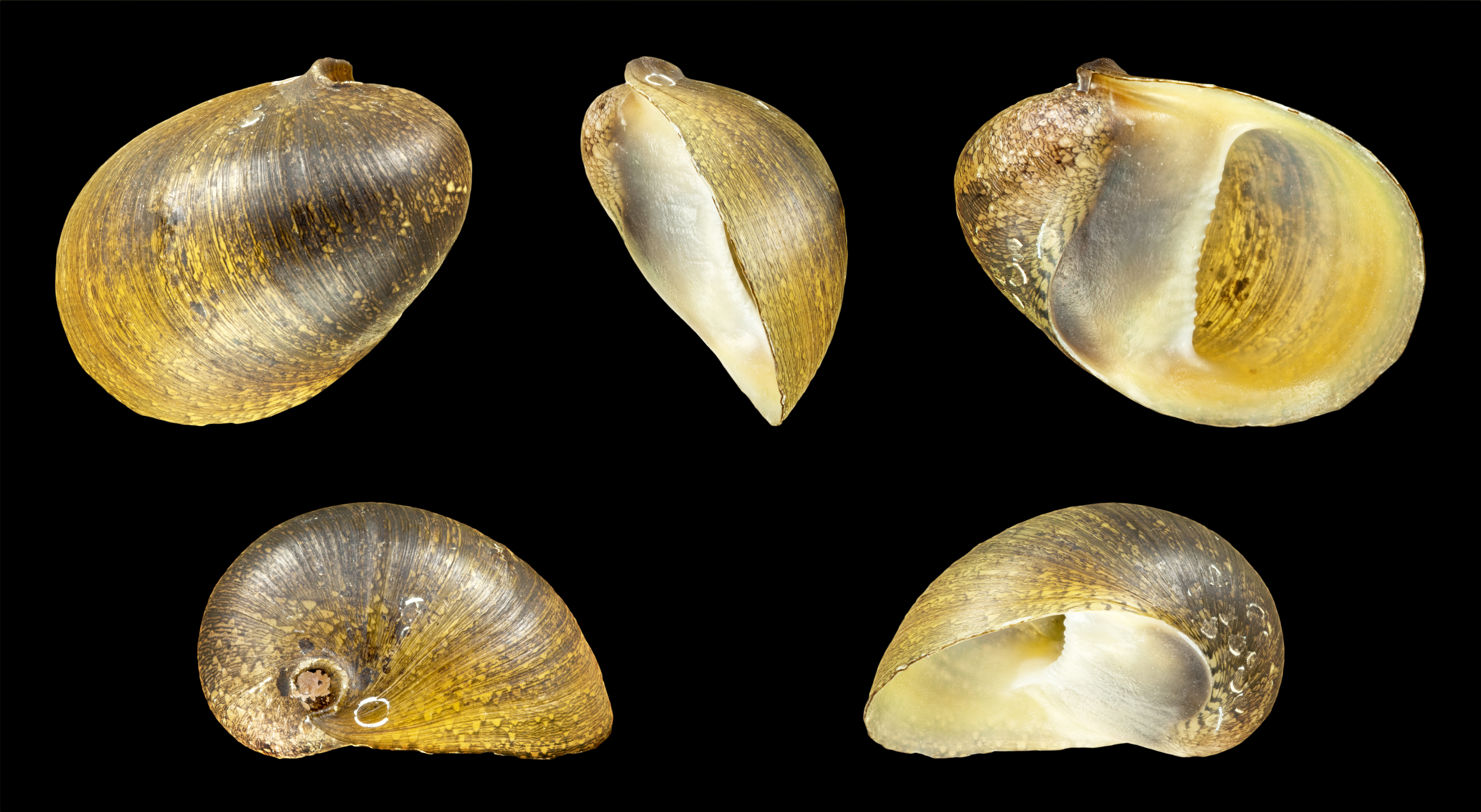
Shell of Neritina pulligera from various angles. The operculum is absent.

=== Shell ===
The shell of N. pulligera is thick and typically measures 20–26 mm (0.79–1.0 in) in length, although some can reach 40 mm (1.6 in). It covers almost the entire body of the snail, such that the foot barely shows and only the tentacles stick out. The shell's colour varies from pale olive-green to dark brown or black. N. pulligera present sexual dimorphism (morphological differences between male and female individuals): males, smaller in size, generally have a more vibrant shell colour.

In both sexes, the shell is oval with a large opening (aperture) and an orange band running along the inside of the aperture. The spire (coiling part of the shell) is very low, but has a distinct apex (pointed tip of the shell). At the aperture, the outer margin (lip) forms a small ridge toward the apex. The inner lip is broad and has a thick, flat area (callus) which covers part of the aperture. This callus has a bluish-black colour on the outer side which gradually fades toward the inner side. It is also slightly toothed at the inner edge. The operculum, a "trapdoor" used by the snail to close its shell, is slightly convex on the outside with fine lines running lengthwise. Its back end is pale tan, while the front is pinkish with dark blue circular streaks in-between. From the inside, the operculum is slightly concave and dirty green with rosy white spots.

Like other members of the subfamily Neritimorpha, N. pulligera presents a convoluted protoconch (the earliest shell formed during the larval stage), with each new whorl overlapping the earlier one. The protoconch of N. pulligera larvae has prominent ridges running lengthwise along the last half-whorl.

=== Radula ===
Besides the shell, another structure useful in gastropod taxonomy is the radula, a tongue-like structure covered with rows of chitinous teeth used by snails to feed by scraping the surface. According to Horace Burrington Baker (1923), the structure of N. pulligera's radula is similar to that of Neritina punctulata, but the first lateral tooth next to the central one (A-central) is broader and the third lateral tooth (C-central) has much smaller cusps. The inner lateral teeth are strongly modified and carry 45 vestigial cusps that extend behind the body of the tooth. The outer lateral teeth, or uncini (numerous closely packed marginal teeth) are long, narrow, and have smooth tips and long cusps.

=== Reproductive system ===
Accoerding to E. A. Andrews (1937), within the genus Neritina, the anus is closer to the opening of the oviduct (passageway which transports the eggs to the outside) than in related genera. In N. pulligera, it is conjoined with the oviduct opening and extends laterally rather than forming a round shape.

Females of N. pulligera have a specialised organ called the crystal or reinforcement sac. This organ stores solid particles used to produce a hard calcareous egg capsule in which the eggs are laid. These particles can include sand, sponge spicules, diatoms, or foraminifera shells, depending on the snail's location. Females also have an external structure called the female ridge, a fleshy fold of skin next to the right eye and tentacle. Andrews (1937) theorises that it may help guide sperm transfer during mating, yet there are no recorded observations.

Males of N. pulligera produce a spermatophore, a sperm packet transferred entirely to the female during reproduction. In N. pulligera, it is a long double tube filled with granular matter, bent in a wide loop and ending in thin filaments. Spermatophores are introduced into the female one or two at a time. Several can be stored within her reproductive tract, such that the female can reproduce continuously.

== Taxonomy and nomenclature ==
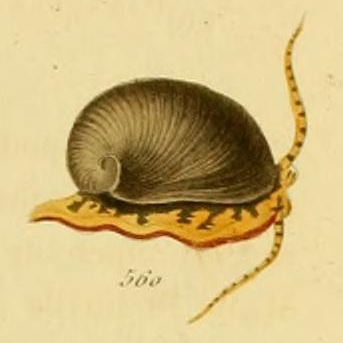
19th-century drawing of Neritina pulligera by Jean-Charles Chenu

N. pulligera was first described in 1767 by Swedish biologist Carl Linnaeus from a specimen found in India. The specific epithet pulligera comes from the Latin words pullus ("dark coloured") and gero ("to carry"). N. pulligera is the type species (reference species) of the Genus Neritina, a monophyletic and well-established group.

In the 19th century several authors described new snail species based on shell features such as morphology, size, and colour. Many of these species were later placed as synonyms or subspecies of N. pulligera as researchers noticed that mollusc shells frequently showed phenotypic plasticity. However, in the 21st century morphometric and genetic analyses confirmed that several of these snails are actually separate species. This includes Neritina petitii, Neritina canalis, Neritina iris, Neritina asperulata, and Neritina powisiana (former synonyms of N. pulligera) in 2009 as well as Neritina stumpffi and Neritina knorri (former subspecies of N. pulligera) in 2017. As of 2025 WoRMS (World Register of Marine Species) accepts the taxonomic classification of N. pulligera as proposed by Abdou et al., 2017 and shown in the cladogram below:.

- Outgroup
  - Neritilia rubida
  - Septaria porcellana
- Neritina
  - Neritina stumpfii
  - - Neritina asperulata
    - - Neritina powisiana
      - - Neritina sp. Suji
        - Neritina petitii
      - - Neritina iris
        - - Neritina delesteneii
          - Neritina knorri
        - - Neritina pulligera
          - Neritina canalis

== Distribution and habitat ==
N. pulligera originated in Southeast Asia based on fossils of the Pliocene and Pleistocene ages found in Java. It is native across the Indo-west Pacific. Records include India (Andaman and Nicobar Islands), Madagascar, northern Australia, Mozambique, South Africa (KwaZulu-Natal), and the Comoro Islands. It has also been reported as a native from Japan. The IUCN Freshwater Biodiversity Assessment, which occurred between 2003 and 2009, classified N. pulligera as a species of Least Concern (LC) for southern Africa in the pan-African scope.

N. pulligera is sold worldwide as part of the aquarium trade. As with other pet trade species, its international commerce raises concerns about a potential biological invasion leading to the decline of native species. However, the species has not been documented outside of its native range as of 2023. Studies from the European Union and the United Kingdom indicate a low temperature suitability for N. pulligera in the EU and in the UK, respectively, even under future climatic scenarios.

N. pulligera lives in fast-flowing streams and rivers with rocky substrates. It colonises the entire freshwater course down to areas near the tidal influence of the ocean, such that it is also found in brackish waters. It is often found in groups on boulders or coral blocks under moderate currents (20–50 cm/sec). When currents become too strong (1 m/sec), they take shelter next to stones and face away from the current. N. pulligera is most commonly reported under warm water temperatures (between 23–29 °C) and is mostly found in low elevational zonations.

== Ecology and behaviour ==
=== Reproduction ===
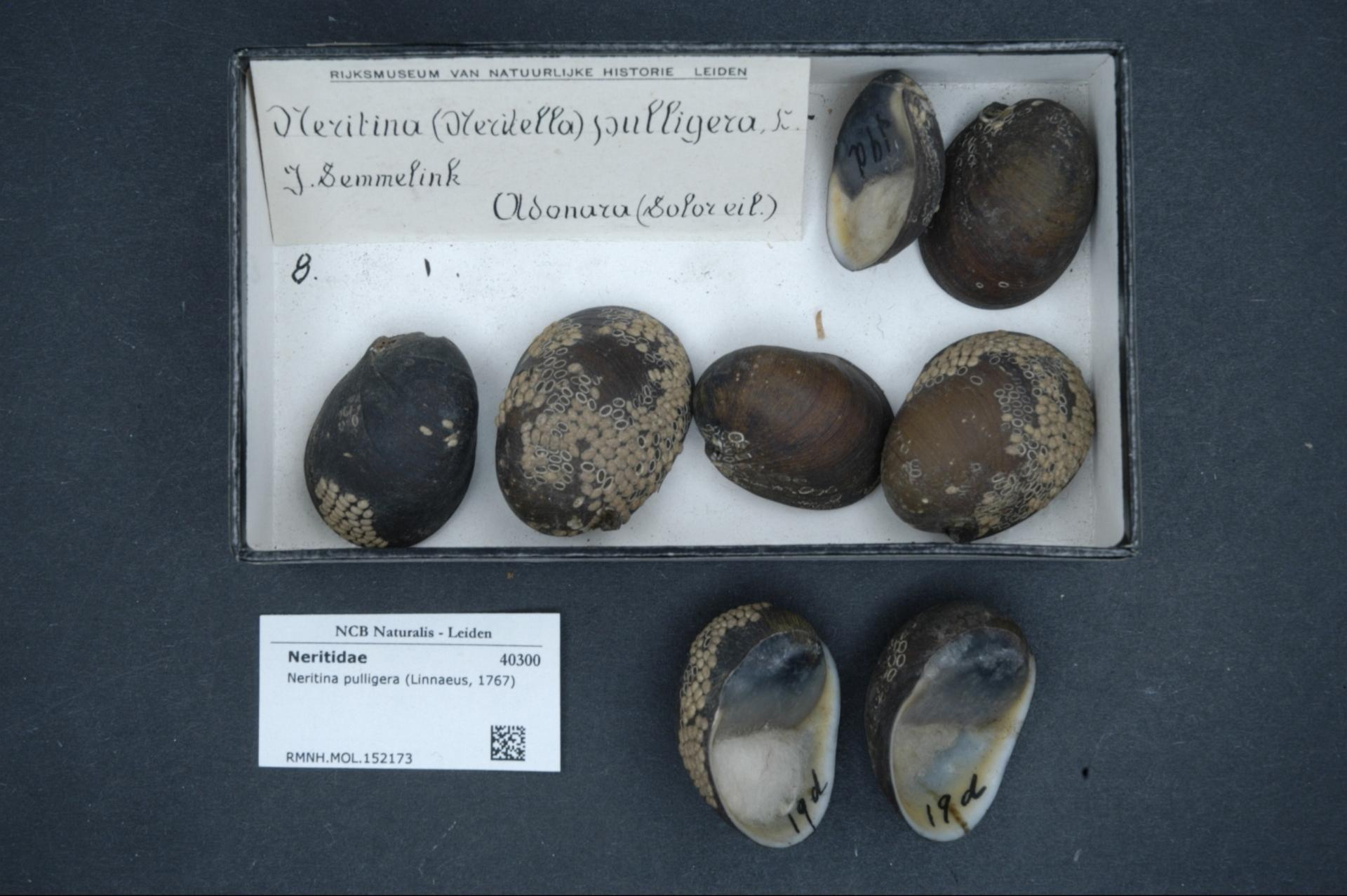
A collection of N. pulligera shells covered in egg capsules

Like other neritids, N. pulligera has separate sexes. The female is fertilised internally and lays its eggs inside a hard calcareous capsule. This capsule is relatively large compared to other Neritidae, about 2.11 × 1.57 mm on average, and elliptical in shape. Eggs are laid in clusters of 9–39 capsules. Like other Neritina species, N. pulligera presents a unique egg-laying behaviour by preferably attaching its eggs to the shells of other living snails. This, together with the reinforced capsules, protects the eggs from predation by other snails. Predatory snails must scrape the capsule surface with their radula for several minutes to access the eggs, which is made especially difficult when they are on moving shells. Like other neritids, N. pulligera has an amphidromous life cycle: larvae drift downstream into the marine environment and juveniles migrate upstream to mature and reproduce.

=== Interspecific interactions ===
Predation on adult N. pulligera has not been documented. Taylor (1976) suggested that the thick shell of neritids provides an effective defence from the shell-boring predatory muricid snails. However, the closely related genera Clithon and Vittina facultatively feed on the eggs of N. pulligera. Neritina asperulata and, to a lesser extent, Neritina petitii engage in an obligatory "hitchhiking" behaviour with larger neritids such as N. pulligera. Juveniles attach to the shell of the host and are carried upstream as it migrates. This behaviour spares the juveniles from expending energy in migration (since both are also amphidromous species) and protects them from predators along the way.

== Human relevance ==
=== Aquarium trade ===
N. pulligera is traded as an ornamental species in the aquarium industry. It is popular for its peaceful nature and ease of care and is often introduced as part of a "clean-up crew" to combat algae growth. However, these snails feed exclusively on algae and biofilm, and may starve once the algae infestation is taken care of and food availability declines. Newly imported individuals often arrive famished. N. pulligera will not eat conventional fish or invertebrate food but will graze on homemade algae stones. Because juveniles do not develop in fresh water, the species was not yet successfully bred in captivity as of 2025 and all traded individuals are wild caught. This practice raises concerns about impacts on local N. pulligera populations.

=== Other uses ===
N. pulligera is used for food in some parts of Viti Levu, Fiji.
