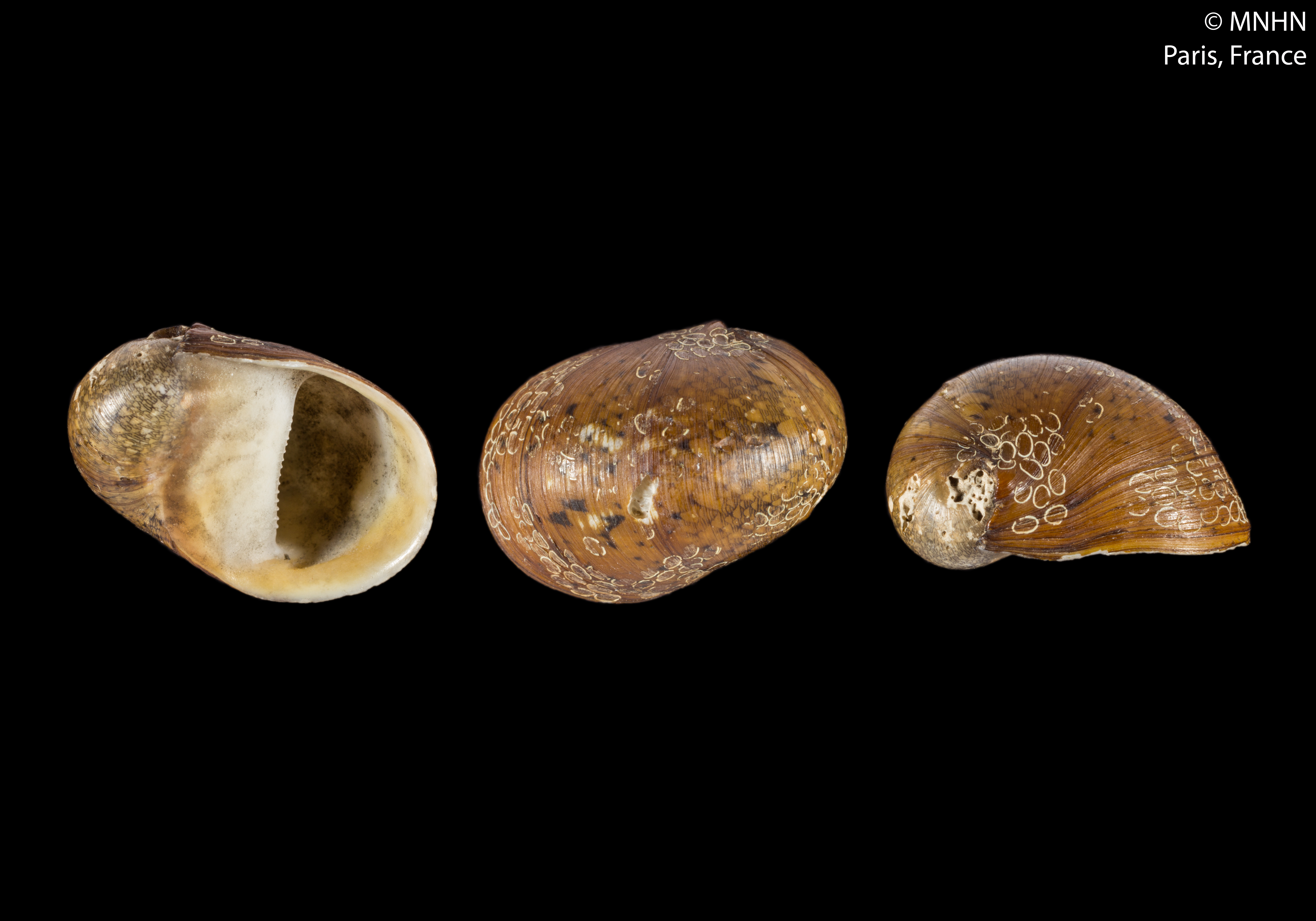
- Neritina asperulata shells (syntype at MNHN, Paris)

Conservation status
- Least Concern (IUCN 3.1)

Scientific classification
- Kingdom: Animalia
- Phylum: Mollusca
- Class: Gastropoda
- Order: Cycloneritida
- Family: Neritidae
- Genus: Neritina
- Species: N. asperulata

Binomial name
- Neritina asperulata (Récluz, 1843)

Synonyms
- Neripteron (Pseudonerita) asperulatum (Récluz, 1843)· accepted, alternate representation; Neripteron asperulatum (Récluz, 1843); Nerita asperulata Récluz, 1843 (original combination); Neritina sulculosa Martens, 1877; Pseudonerita sulculosa (Martens, 1877)

= Neritina asperulata =

Species of gastropod

Neritina asperulata is a species of a marine and freshwater snail, an aquatic gastropod mollusk in the family Neritidae, the nerites.

== Distribution ==
This species occurs in the Philippines and on the Solomon Islands.

== Ecology ==
Neritina asperulata is an amphidromous species.

Juvenile snails of Neritina asperulata attach to a shell of another neritid snail Neritina pulligera and migrate like this for several kilometers.
