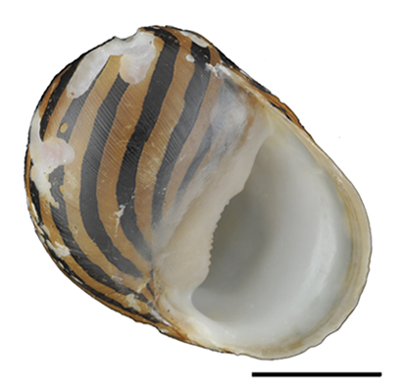
- Apertural view of a shell of Vittina coromandeliana. Scale bar is 10 mm.

Conservation status
- Least Concern (IUCN 3.1)

Scientific classification
- Kingdom: Animalia
- Phylum: Mollusca
- Class: Gastropoda
- Order: Cycloneritida
- Family: Neritidae
- Genus: Vittina
- Species: V. coromandeliana

Binomial name
- Vittina coromandeliana (G. B. Sowerby I, 1836)

Synonyms
- Neritina coromandeliana G. B. Sowerby I, 1832

= Vittina coromandeliana =

Species of gastropod

Vittina coromandeliana, also known as Neritina coromandeliana, is a species of a freshwater snail, an aquatic gastropod mollusk in the family Neritidae.

== Distribution ==
Distribution of Vittina coromandeliana includes Indonesia and Philippines.

== Description ==
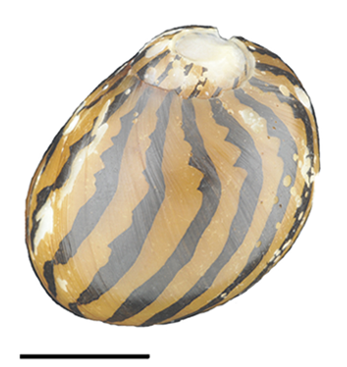
Abapertural view of a shell of Vittina coromandeliana. Scale bar is 10 mm.

== Human use ==
Vittina coromandeliana is a part of ornamental pet trade for freshwater aquaria.
