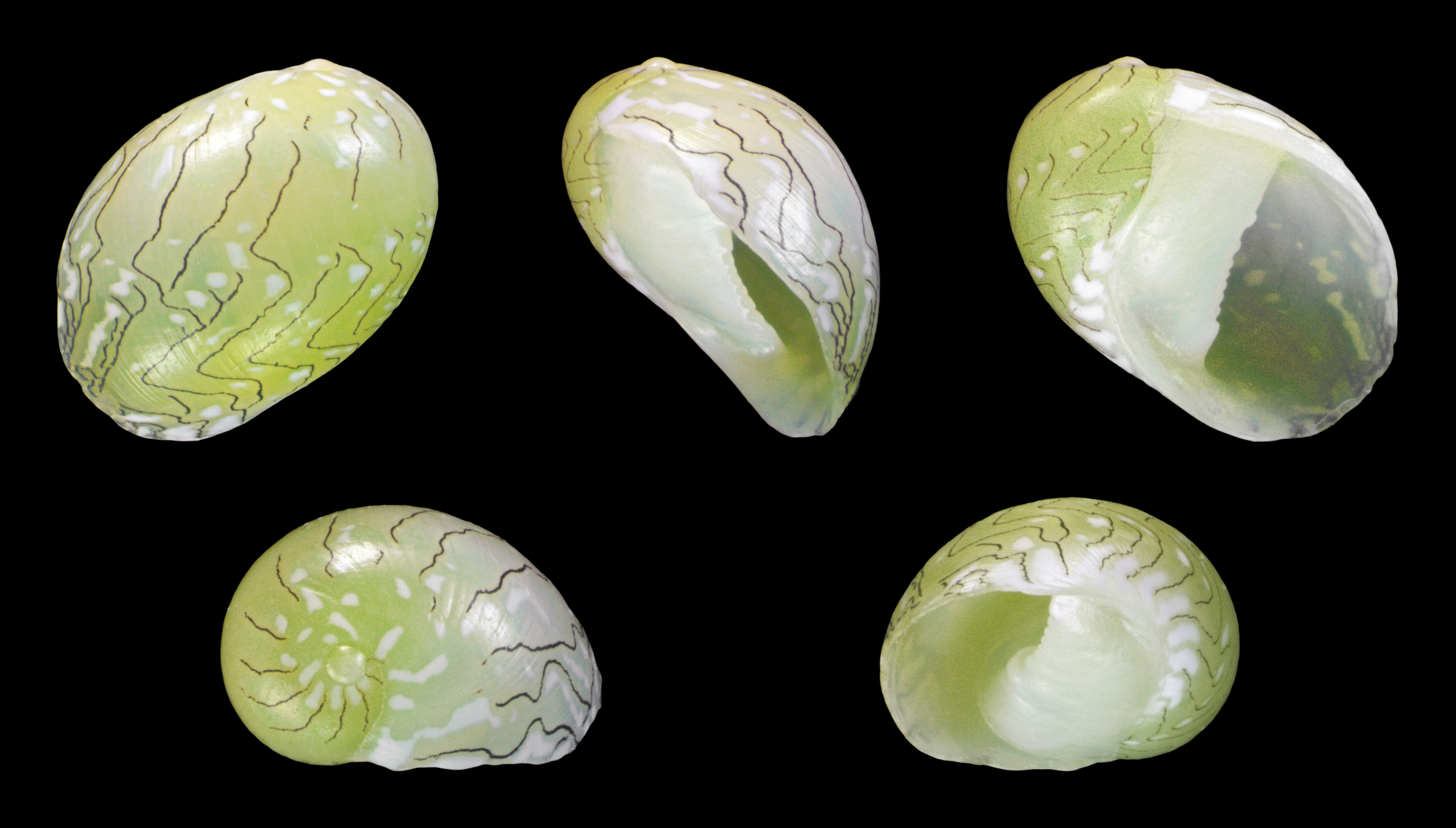
- Five views of a shell of Smaragdia viridis

Scientific classification
- Kingdom: Animalia
- Phylum: Mollusca
- Class: Gastropoda
- Order: Cycloneritida
- Family: Neritidae
- Genus: Smaragdia
- Species: S. viridis

Binomial name
- Smaragdia viridis (Linnaeus, 1758)

Synonyms
- Nerita matonia Risso, 1826 · unaccepted (synonym); Nerita pallidula Risso, 1826; Nerita viridis Linnaeus, 1758; Neritina (Smaragdia) viridis (Linnaeus, 1758) d (unaccepted combination); Neritina feuilleti Audouin, 1826 (dubious synonym); Neritina viridis (Linnaeus, 1758) (unaccepted combination); Smaragdia feuilletii (Audouin, 1826); Smaragdia viridemaris Mauri, 1917 (dubious synonym); Smaragdia viridis viridemaris Maury, 1917; Smaragdia viridis weyssei Russell, 1940

= Smaragdia viridis =

Species of gastropod

Smaragdia viridis. common name the "emerald nerite" is a species of small, green sea snail, a marine gastropod mollusk in the family Neritidae, the nerites.

== Distribution ==
The distribution of Smaragdia viridis is disjunct, consisting of the Mediterranean Sea and the Caribbean Sea.

== Description ==
The shell is oval, depressed, light green with a yellowish hue, smooth and shiny. The shell often has interrupted fine bands or lines in white and/or purple. The columellar region of the shell is greenish white, broad, convex, margin curved and with fine teeth. The maximum length of the shell is 7.5 mm. The maximum recorded shell length is 8 mm.

The visible soft parts of the animal are the same shade of green as the shell.

== Ecology ==
Smaragdia viridis is a marine littoral species. Minimum recorded depth is 0 m. Maximum recorded depth is 20 m. It is documented to feed directly on seagrasses, rather than on their algae epiphytes, as is the case with many other seagrass-associated snails. The species it feeds on are different in the two different areas of its distribution. In the Mediterranean the species has been recorded feeding on Posidonia oceanica, Zostera marina and Cymodocea nodosa whereas in the Caribbean it consumes Thalassia testudinum, Halodule wrightii and Syringodium filiforme.
