= Neritona =

Scientific classification
- Kingdom: Animalia
- Phylum: Mollusca
- Class: Gastropoda
- Order: Cycloneritida
- Superfamily: Neritoidea
- Family: Neritidae
- Genus: Neritona; Martens, 1869

Type species
- Neritina labiosa G. B. Sowerby I, 1836<

Synonyms
- Paludomus (Tanalia) Gray, 1847; Serenia Benson, 1856 (unavailable name: established in synonymy); Tanalia Gray, 1847

Genus of gastropods

Neritona is a genus of small aquatic snails with an operculum, marine, brackish water, and sometimes freshwater gastropod molluscs in the family Neritidae, the nerites.

== Species ==
Species in the genus Neritona include:

- Neritona granosa (G. B. Sowerby I, 1825)
- Neritona juttingae (Mienis, 1973)
- Neritona labiosa (G. B. Sowerby I, 1836)
- Neritona macgillivrayi (Reeve, 1855)
- Neritona melanesica Riech, 1935
- Neritona planissima (Mousson, 1869)

Species brought into synonymy

- Neritona latissima (Broderip, 1833): synonym of Clypeolum latissimum (Broderip, 1833)
- † Neritona martensi Brusina, 1884: synonym of † Theodoxus martensi (Brusina, 1884)
