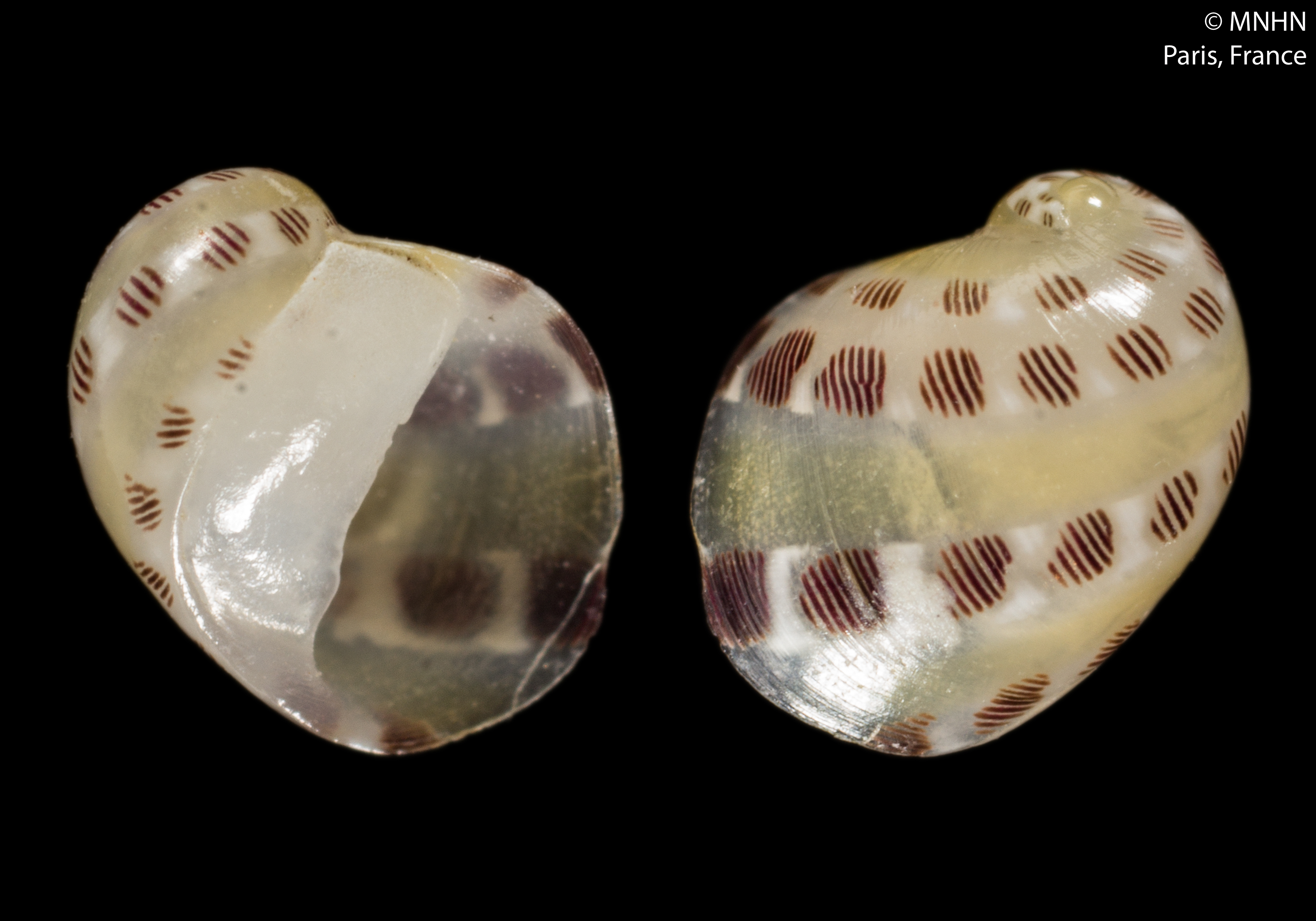
- Shell of Smaragdia purpureomaculata (holotype at MNHN, Paris)

Scientific classification
- Kingdom: Animalia
- Phylum: Mollusca
- Class: Gastropoda
- Order: Cycloneritida
- Family: Neritidae
- Genus: Smaragdia
- Species: S. purpureomaculata

Binomial name
- Smaragdia purpureomaculata Dekker, 2000

= Smaragdia purpureomaculata =

Species of gastropod

Smaragdia purpureomaculata is a species of sea snail, a marine gastropod mollusk in the family Neritidae.

== Description ==
This species's shell has been described as a thin sculpture, feeling smooth apart from on the very fine growth lines. Ovate in shape, the shell has a subtle level of translucency, with a whitish colour and murky yellowish-green spiral bands. The length of the shell attains 2.8 mm.

== Distribution ==
This marine species occurs in the Gulf of Aqaba, Egypt.
