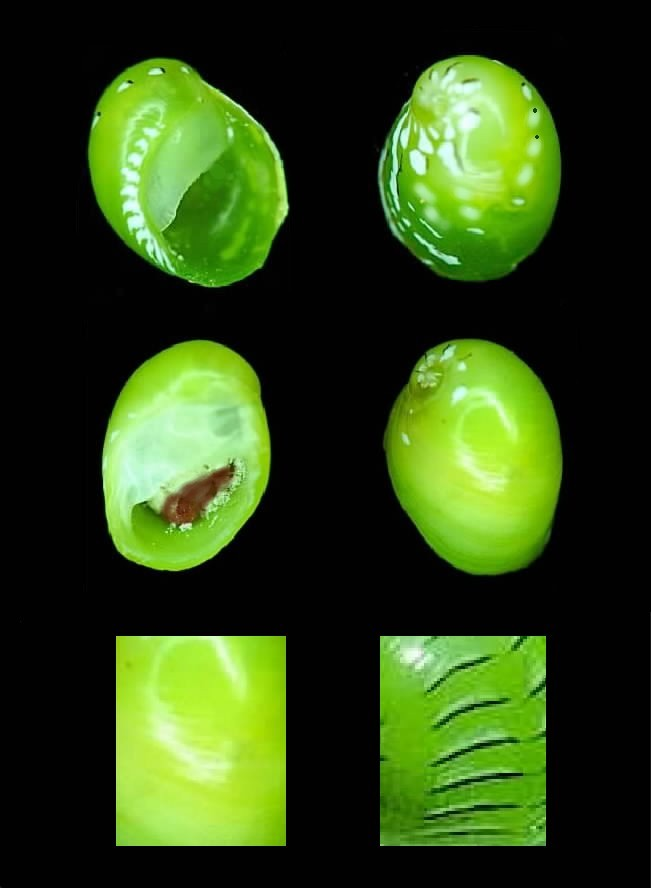
- Smaragdia viridis views

Scientific classification
- Kingdom: Animalia
- Phylum: Mollusca
- Class: Gastropoda
- Order: Cycloneritida
- Superfamily: Neritoidea
- Family: Neritidae
- Genus: Smaragdia; Issel, 1869

Type species
- Nerita viridis Linnaeus, 1758

Synonyms
- Neritina (Smaragdia) Issel, 1869; Smaragdista Iredale, 1936; Tanzaniella Lupu, 1979 (invalid: a junior homonym of Tanzaniella Hoffman, 1977 [Chilopoda])

= Smaragdia =

Genus of gastropods

Smaragdia is a genus of small sea snails, marine gastropod mollusks in the subfamily Neritinae of the family Neritidae, the nerites.

== Species ==
Species within the genus Smaragdia include:

- Smaragdia bryanae (Pilsbry, 1918)
- † Smaragdia expansa (Reuss in M. Hörnes, 1856)
- † Smaragdia merignacensis (Cossmann & Peyrot, 1918)
- Smaragdia patburkeae Eichhorst, 2016
- Smaragdia pulcherrima (Angas, 1871)
- Smaragdia purpureomaculata Dekker, 2000
- Smaragdia rangiana (Recluz, 1841)
- Smaragdia roseopicta Thiele, 1930
- Smaragdia souverbiana (Montrouzier, 1863)
- Smaragdia tragena (Iredale, 1936) - synonym: Smaragdia abakionigraphis Drivas & Jay, 1989
- Smaragdia viridis (Linnaeus, 1758)

Synonyms

- Smaragdia abakionigraphis Drivas & Jay, 1989: synonym of Smaragdia tragena (Iredale, 1936)
- Smaragdia feuilleti (Audouin, 1826) - type species: synonym of Smaragdia viridis (Linnaeus, 1758)
- Smaragdia paulucciana (Gassies, 1870)<: synonym of Clithon parvulum (Le Guillou, 1841)
- Smaragdia viridemaris Mauri, 1917: synonym of Smaragdia viridis (Linnaeus, 1758) (dubious synonym)
