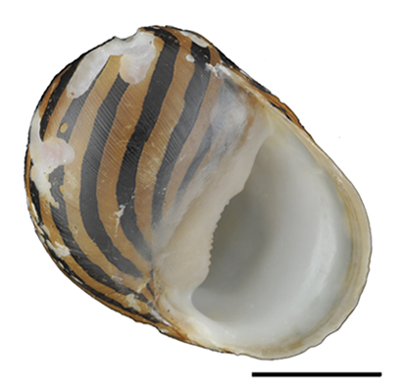
- Apertural view of a shell of Vittina coromandeliana. Scale bar is 10 mm.

Scientific classification
- Kingdom: Animalia
- Phylum: Mollusca
- Class: Gastropoda
- Order: Cycloneritida
- Superfamily: Neritoidea
- Family: Neritidae
- Genus: Vittina; H. B. Baker, 1923

Type species
- Nerita roissyana Récluz, 1841

Synonyms
- Nerita (Paranerita) Bourne, 1908 (Invalid: junior homonym of Paranerita Hampson, 1901 [Lepidoptera]); Neritina (Vittina) H. B. Baker, 1923 (original rank); Neritina (Vittoida) H.B. Baker, 1923 (a junior synonym); Paranerita Bourne, 1908 (Invalid: junior homonym of Paranerita Hampson, 1901 [Lepidoptera])

= Vittina =

Genus of gastropods

Vittina is a genus of brackish water and freshwater snails with an operculum, aquatic gastropod mollusks in the subfamily Neritininae of the family Neritidae, the nerites.

Vittina was previously recognized as a subgenus of the genus Neritina.

== Distribution ==
Species of this genus are found estuarine and fluviatile in the Indo-Pacific.

== Species ==
Species in the genus Vittina include:

- Vittina adumbrata (Reeve, 1856)
- Vittina aquatilis (Reeve, 1856)
- Vittina coromandeliana (G. B. Sowerby I, 1836)
- Vittina cumingiana (Récluz, 1842)
- Vittina gagates (Lamarck, 1822)
- Vittina jovis (Récluz, 1843)
- Vittina natalensis (Reeve, 1855)
- Vittina pennata (Born, 1778)
- Vittina plumbea (G.W. Sowerby II, 1849)
- † Vittina pomahakaensis (Finlay, 1924)
- Vittina pouchetii (Hombron & Jacquinot, 1848)
- Vittina roissyana (Récluz, 1841)
- Vittina semiconica (Lamarck, 1822)
- Vittina serrulata (Récluz, 1842)
- Vittina smithii (W. Wood, 1828)
- Vittina solium (Récluz, 1846)
- Vittina turrita (Gmelin, 1791)
- Vittina turtoni (Récluz, 1843)
- Vittina variegata (Lesson, 1831)
- Vittina waigiensis (Lesson, 1831)
- Vittina wallisiarum (Récluz, 1850)

Taxon inquirendum

- Vittina striolata (Récluz, 1841)
