= Vitta (gastropod) =

Scientific classification
- Kingdom: Animalia
- Phylum: Mollusca
- Class: Gastropoda
- Order: Cycloneritida
- Superfamily: Neritoidea
- Family: Neritidae
- Genus: Vitta; Mörch, 1852

Synonyms
- Agapilia Harzhauser & Kowalke, 2001 †; Clithon (Vittoclithon) H. B. Baker, 1923; Neritella (Vitta) Mörch, 1852 (original rank); Neritina (Vitta) Mörch, 1852 (new combination); Neritina (Vittoclithon) H. B. Baker, 1923· accepted, alternate representation; Theodoxus (Vittoclithon) H. B. Baker, 1923; Vitta (Vitta) Mörch, 1852· accepted, alternate representation; Vitta (Vittoclithon) H. B. Baker, 1923· accepted, alternate representation

Genus of gastropods

Vitta is a genus of brackish water and freshwater snails, an aquatic gastropod mollusks in the subfamily Neritininae of the family Neritidae, the nerites.

== Species ==
Species within the genus Vitta include:

- Vitta adansoniana (Récluz, 1841)
- Vitta clenchi (Russell, 1940)
- Vitta consobrina Eichhorst, 2016
- Vitta cristata (Morelet, 1864)
- †Vitta duchasteli (Deshayes, 1832)
- Vitta glabrata (G. B. Sowerby II, 1849)
- Vitta kuramoensis (Yoloye & Adegoke, 1977)
- Vitta luteofasciata (K. Miller, 1879)
- Vitta meleagris (Lamarck, 1822)
- Vitta moquiniana (Récluz, 1850)
- †Vitta pachii (Handmann, 1889)
- Vitta perottetiana (Récluz, 1841)
- †Vitta picta (Férussac, 1823)
- Vitta piratica (Russell, 1940)
- Vitta rubricata (Morelet, 1858)
- †Vitta rumeliana Harzhauser, Mandic, Büyükmeriç, Neubauer, Kadolsky & Landau, 2016
- †Vitta schlickumi (Kowalke & Reichenbacher, 2005)
- †Vitta sparsilineata (Dall, 1913)
- Vitta usnea (Röding, 1798)
- Vitta virginea (Linnaeus, 1758)
- Vitta zebra (Bruguière, 1792)
