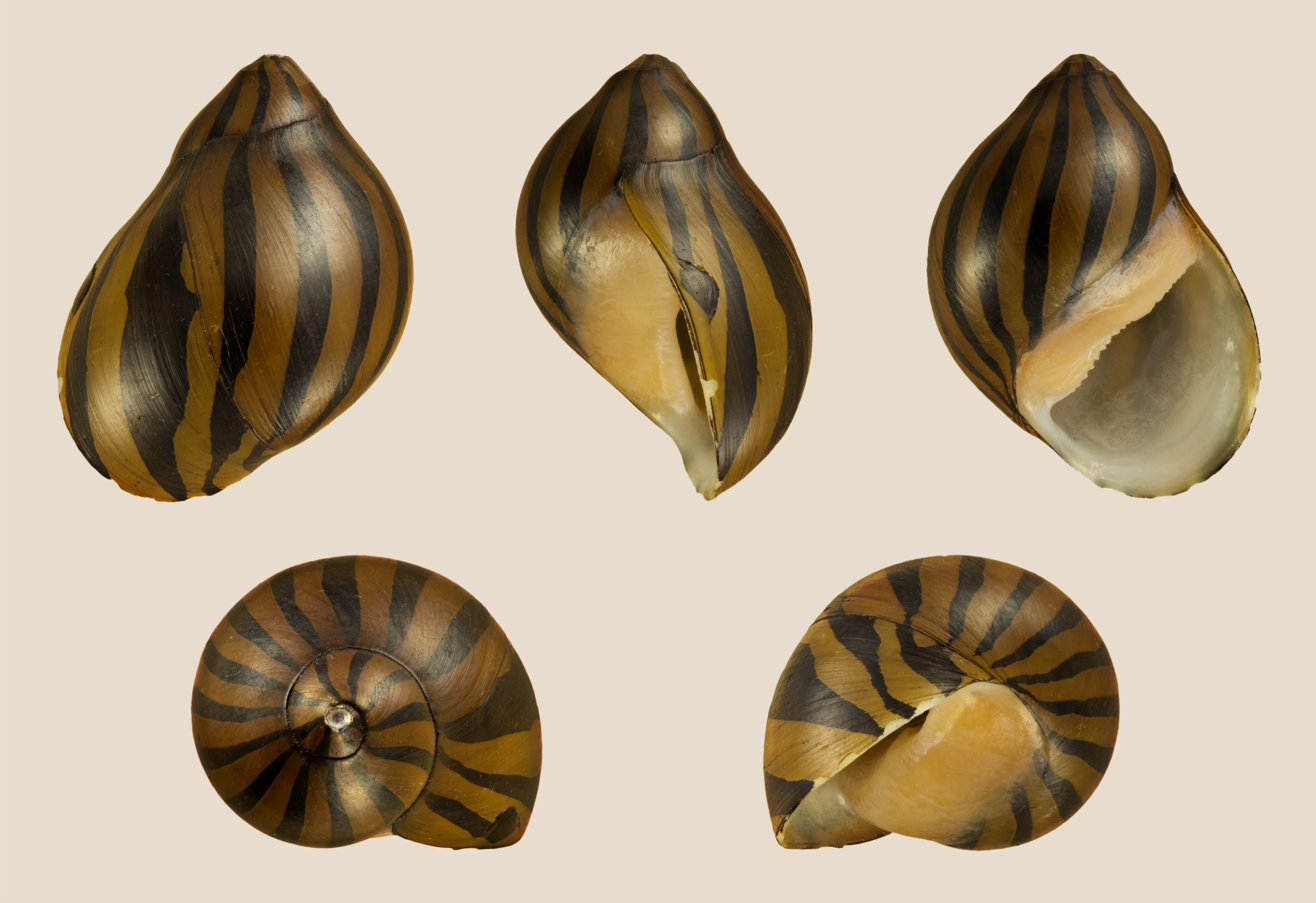

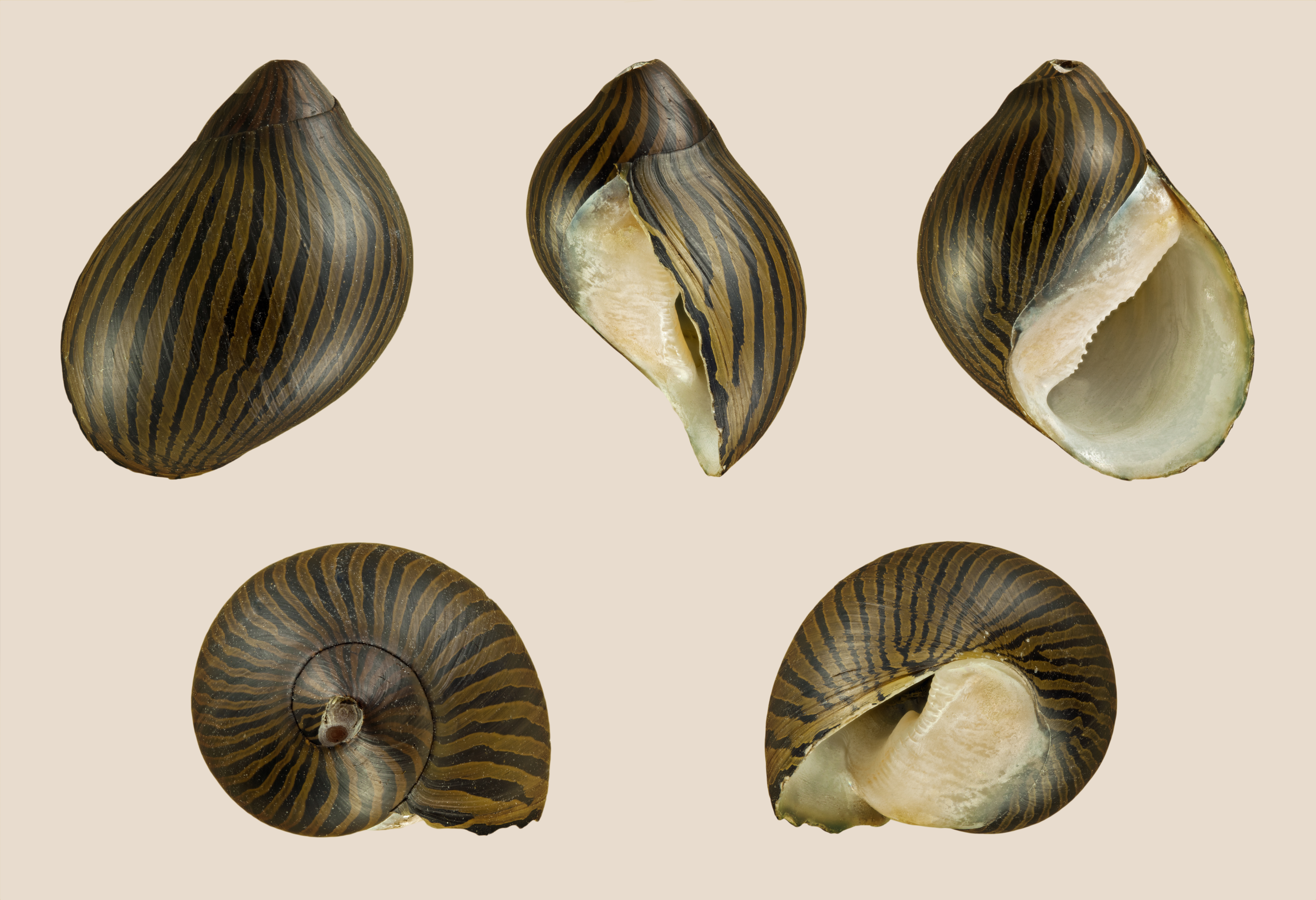
- Vittina turrita shells showing aperture, two morphs shown

Conservation status
- Least Concern (IUCN 3.1)

Scientific classification
- Kingdom: Animalia
- Phylum: Mollusca
- Class: Gastropoda
- Order: Cycloneritida
- Family: Neritidae
- Genus: Vittina
- Species: V. turrita

Binomial name
- Vittina turrita (Gmelin, 1791)

Synonyms
- Nerita turrita Gmelin, 1791 (original combination); Neritina (Vittina) turrita (Gmelin, 1791); Neritina palmae Dall, 1885; Neritina turrita (Gmelin, 1791) (new combination)

= Vittina turrita =

Species of gastropod

Vittina turrita is a species of aquatic snail, a gastropod mollusk in the family Neritidae.

== Distribution ==
Vittina turrita is Indo-Pacific in distribution, with specimens recorded from locations including Madagascar, Papua New Guinea, the Pacific Islands, Indonesia, Vietnam, and Japan, Taiwan.

== Description ==
Native to brackish tidal waters such as mangrove swamps, this snail is also classified as Vittina turrita, and is sold in the freshwater aquarium trade under the common name "tiger nerite" or "tiger snail." Adults may thrive in fresh water with sufficient dissolved minerals. The species has separate male and female individuals; females lay eggs, which hatch into larvae that can survive only in brackish water. Adults grow to about 2.5 cm, and show a pale tan body with a darker tan shell, sometimes brownish or reddish, marked by black bands of varied width. The head has two short antennae which protrude from beneath the shell, each with a small eye at the base (generally invisible beneath the shell). Nerites are slow-moving snails that travel over rocks or hard substrates and do not burrow. Like other members of its genus, the species grazes on algae which it rasps from surfaces with its radula. It may opportunistically feed on other debris, but does not pursue animal food. Because a variety of common names including "zebra nerite" can be used to refer to both species, it is sometimes confused with Neritina natalensis.

== Human use ==
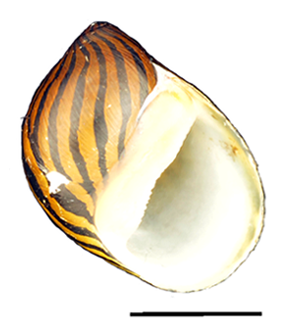
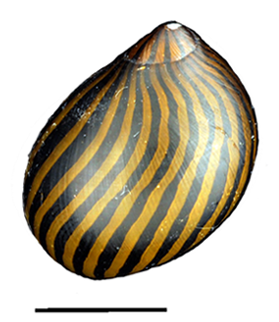
10 mm scale bar

Vittina turrita is common in the pet trade for freshwater aquaria. It is considered a desirable snail for home aquarists because of its attractive pattern, compatible requirements with common freshwater aquarium fish, and the fact that it consumes algae without eating plants or overpopulating in home freshwater tanks.
