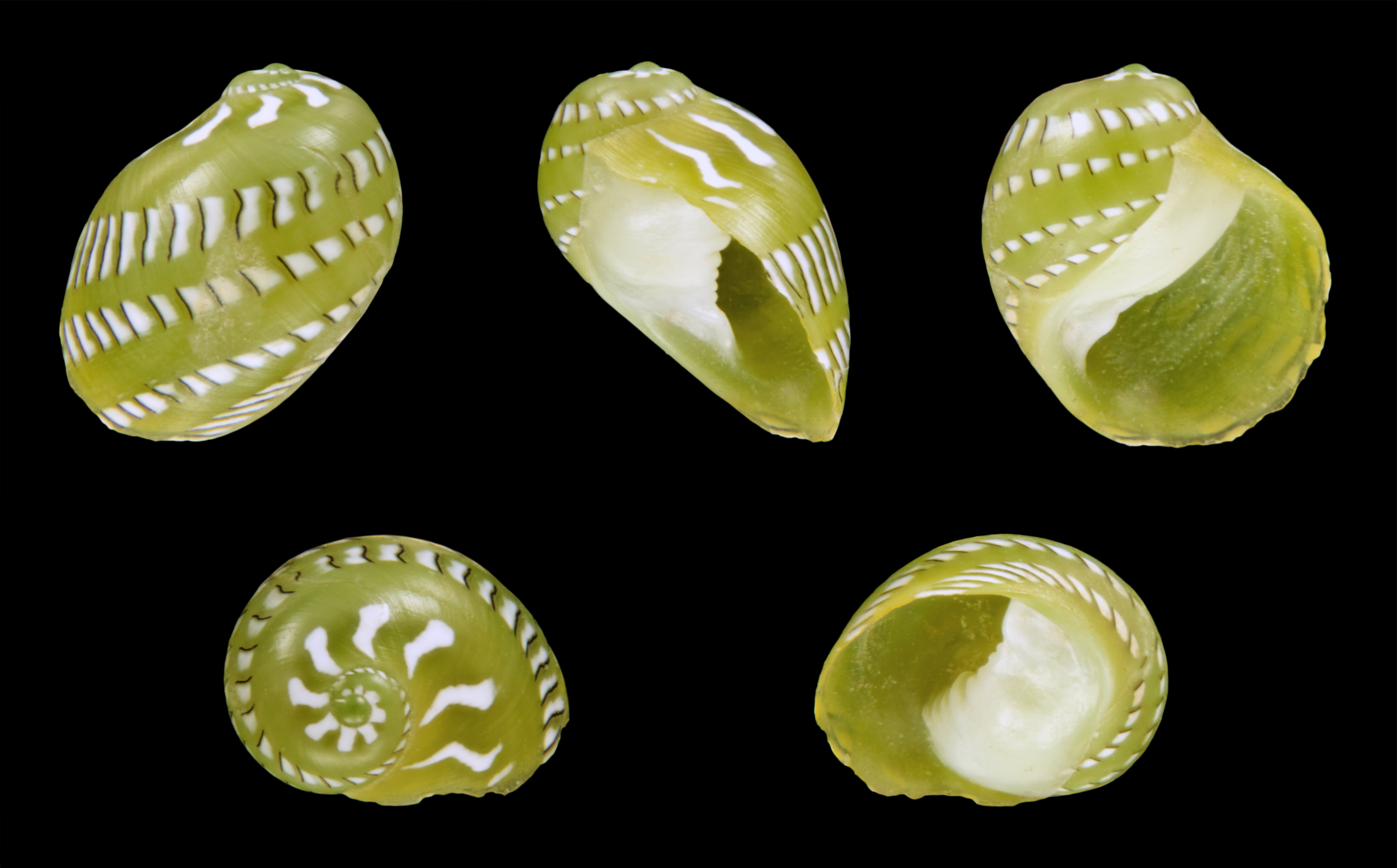

Scientific classification
- Kingdom: Animalia
- Phylum: Mollusca
- Class: Gastropoda
- Order: Cycloneritida
- Family: Neritidae
- Genus: Smaragdia
- Species: S. rangiana

Binomial name
- Smaragdia rangiana (Recluz)

Synonyms
- Neritina rangiana Récluz, 1841

= Smaragdia rangiana =

Species of gastropod

Smaragdia rangiana is a species of sea snail, a marine gastropod mollusk in the family Neritidae.
