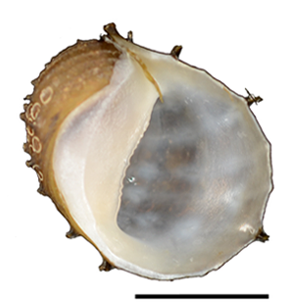
- Apertural view of a shell of Neritona juttingae. Scale bar is 10 mm.

Scientific classification
- Kingdom: Animalia
- Phylum: Mollusca
- Class: Gastropoda
- Order: Cycloneritida
- Family: Neritidae
- Genus: Neritona
- Species: N. juttingae

Binomial name
- Neritona juttingae (Mienis, 1973)

Synonyms
- Nerita aculeata Gmelin, 1791 (unavailable: a junior homonym of Nerita aculeata O.F. Müller, 1774); Nerita aculeata Gmelin, 1791, non Müller, 1774; Neritina juttingae Mienis, 1973

= Neritona juttingae =

Species of gastropod

Neritona juttingae is a species of a freshwater snail, an aquatic gastropod mollusc in the family Neritidae.

== Description ==
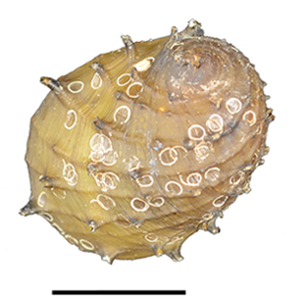
Abapertural view of a shell of Neritina juttingae. Scale bar is 10 mm. There are remains of egg capsules of a neritid on the shell.

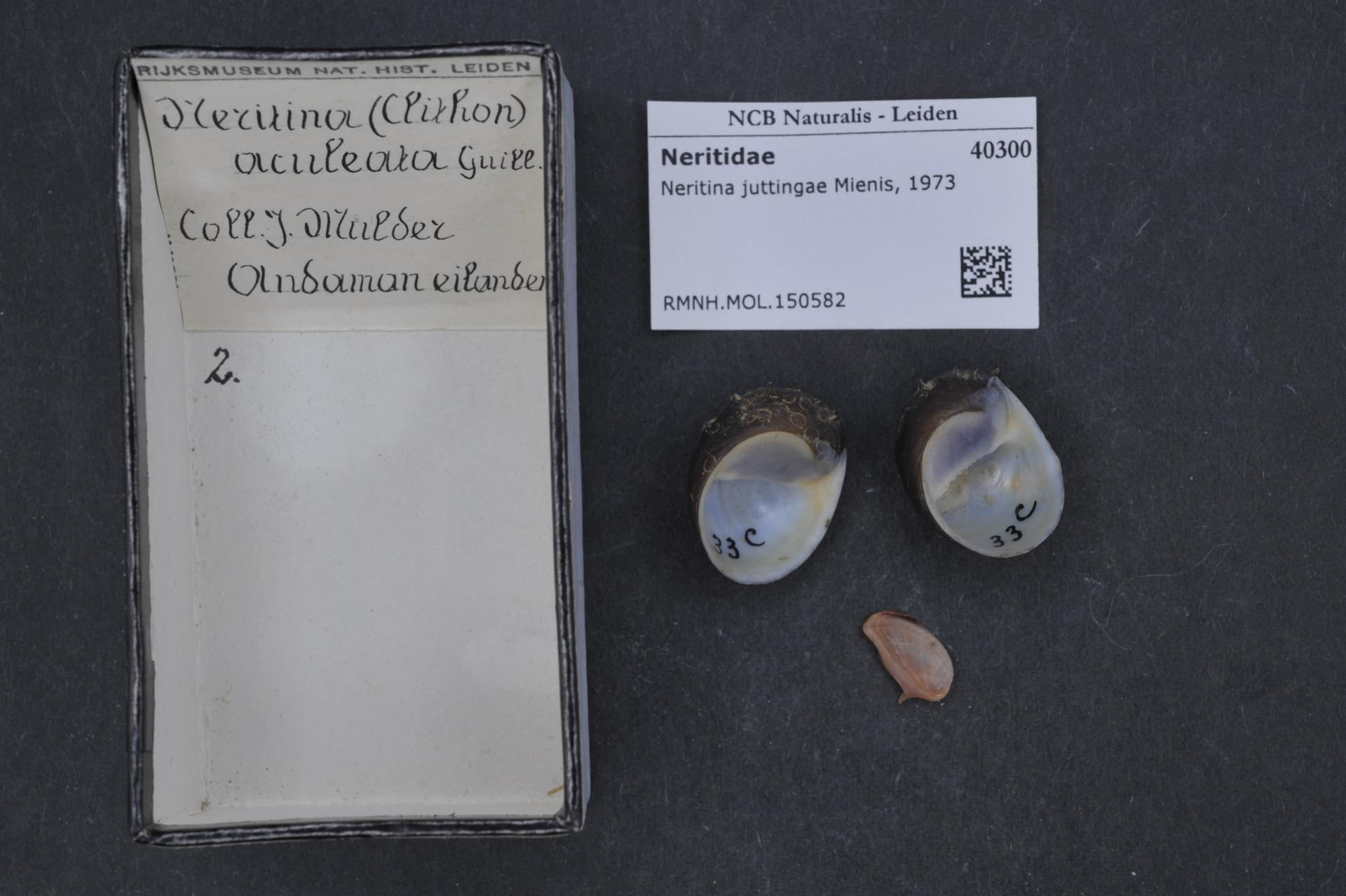
Neritina juttingae shells and operculum.

== Distribution ==
The holotype was found in the River Musi near Palembang, Sumatra, Indonesia.

== Human use ==
It is a part of ornamental pet trade for freshwater aquaria.
