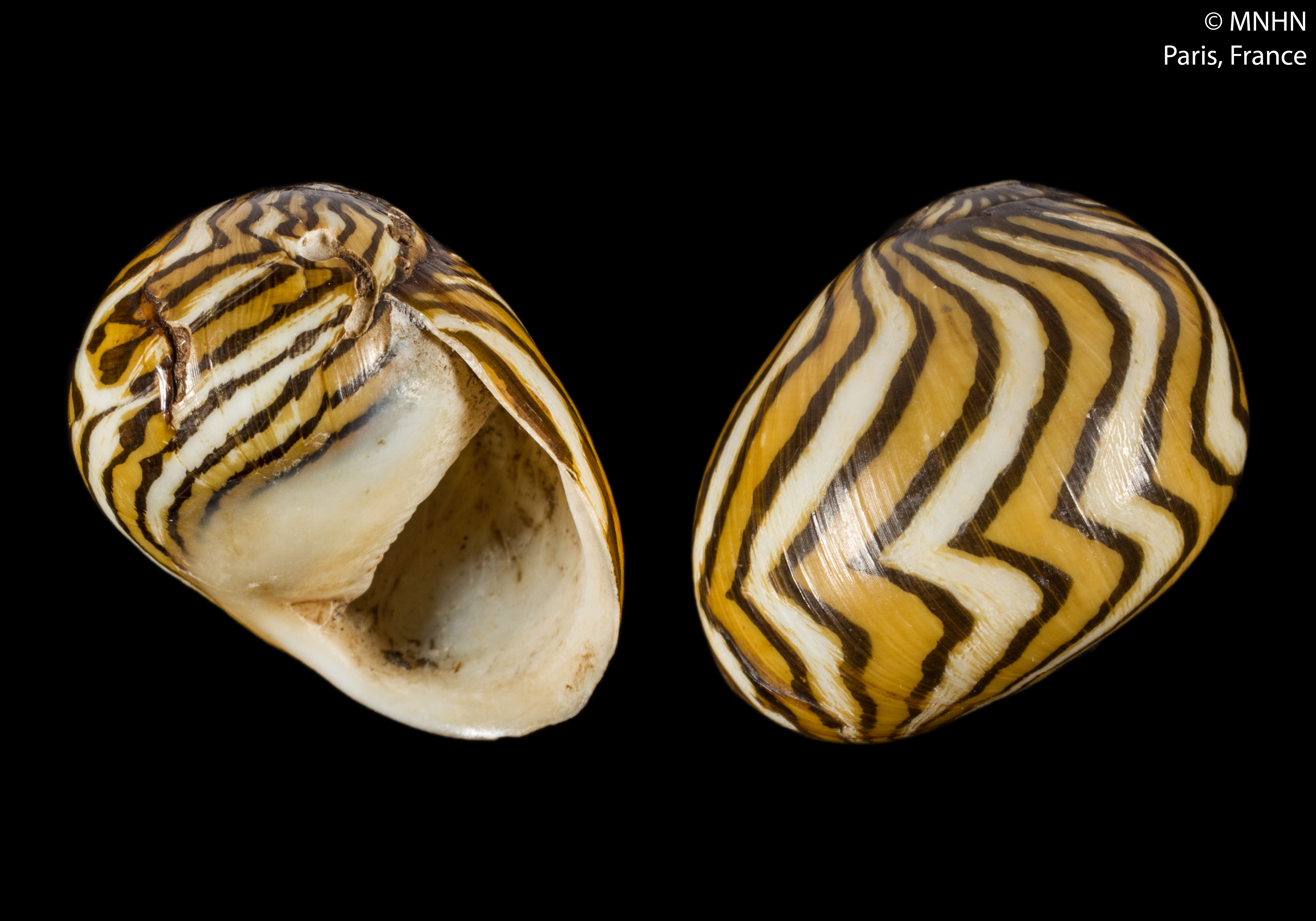

Scientific classification
- Kingdom: Animalia
- Phylum: Mollusca
- Class: Gastropoda
- Order: Cycloneritida
- Family: Neritidae
- Genus: Vitta
- Species: V. zebra

Binomial name
- Vitta zebra (Bruguière, 1792)

Synonyms
- Nerita zebra Bruguière, 1792 (original combination); Neritina zebra (Bruguière, 1792)

= Vitta zebra =

Species of gastropod

Vitta zebra, commonly known as the zebra nerite or zebra snail, is a species of sea snail, a marine gastropod mollusk in the family Neritidae.

== Description ==
Vitta zebra have globular shells with a length of around 25 mm (0.98 in). Their coloration can be highly variable, from dark brown to yellow with straight, curved, or zigzagging black lines. The stripes vary in width, and may sometimes be absent or interspersed with white stripes between black. Body coloration is commonly dark brown with transverse black stripes and spots.

== Distribution ==
Vitta zebra is native to the northeastern coastline of South America and nearby islands in the Caribbean, including French Guiana, Trinidad and Tobago, Guyana, Suriname and parts of Brazil (mouth of the Amazon River) and Venezuela (mouth of the Orinoco River).

== In the aquarium ==
The zebra nerite snail is frequently sold to aquarists. These specimens are typically wild caught, since the snail is difficult to breed in captivity.

This snail is typically sold as an algae eater as it will constantly scrape the glass, hardscape and substrate of the aquarium for algae with its rasping mouth. They are capable of surviving in fresh water, though they require a high PH. A low enough PH will slowly destroy the snail's shell. If an aquarium does not have enough algae, it may be difficult to get them to eat pellet food and they may starve.

Like most nerite snails, the zebra nerite may frequently attempt to escape from its aquarium; thus, a lid is necessary to house the species.
