= Vitta piratica =

Scientific classification
- Kingdom: Animalia
- Phylum: Mollusca
- Class: Gastropoda
- Order: Cycloneritida
- Family: Neritidae
- Genus: Vitta
- Species: V. piratica

Binomial name
- Vitta piratica (Russell, 1940)

Synonyms
- Neritina piratica Russell, 1940

Species of gastropod

Vitta piratica is a species of sea snail, a marine gastropod mollusk in the family Neritidae.

== Distribution ==
The holotype of this species was found in the Wounta Lagoon, Nicaragua.
