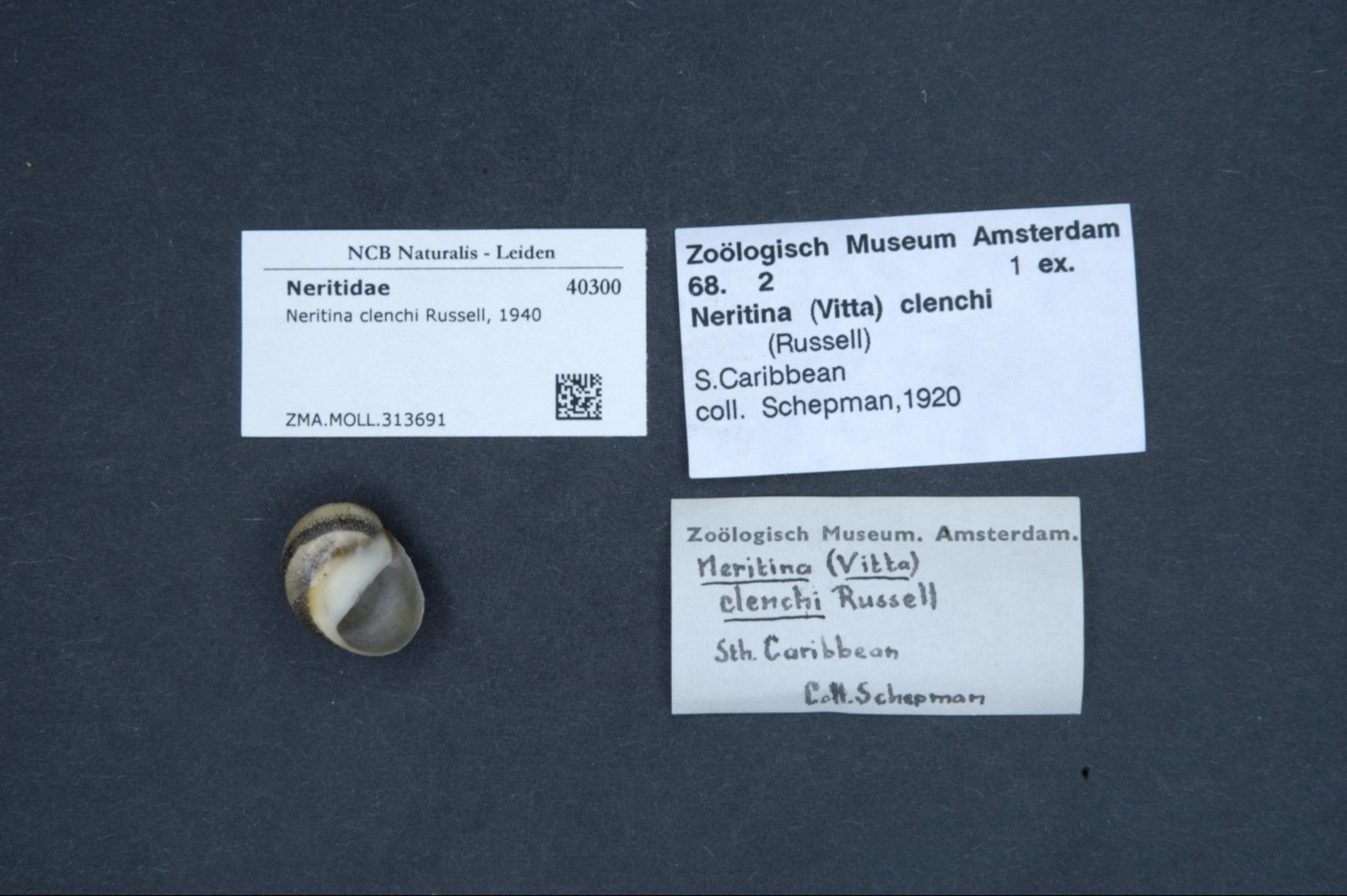

Conservation status
- Secure (NatureServe)

Scientific classification
- Kingdom: Animalia
- Phylum: Mollusca
- Class: Gastropoda
- Order: Cycloneritida
- Family: Neritidae
- Genus: Vitta
- Species: V. clenchi

Binomial name
- Vitta clenchi (Russell, 1940)

Synonyms
- Nerita clenchi Russell, 1940; Neritina clenchi (Russell, 1940)

= Vitta clenchi =

Species of gastropod

Vitta clenchi is a species of sea snail, a marine gastropod mollusk in the family Neritidae.

== Distribution ==
The snail is found in the West Indies and Gulf of Mexico.

== Description ==
The shells are smooth and neritiform with a dark base, heavily speckled with a lighter color. They live in brackish or fresh water, primarily being found in the estuaries of its region. The species is gonochoric and are broadcast spawners.
