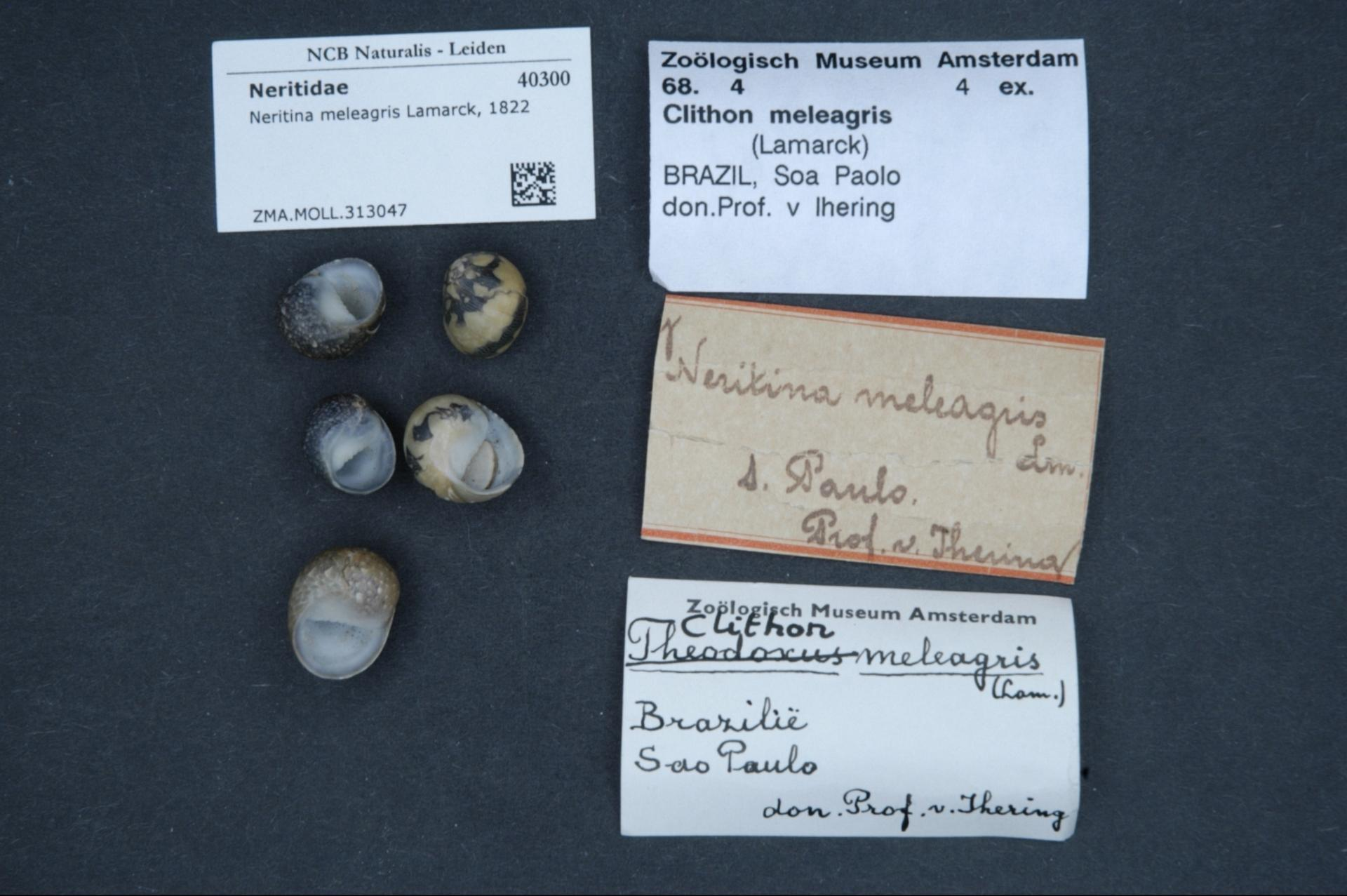
- Vitta meleagris shell

Scientific classification
- Kingdom: Animalia
- Phylum: Mollusca
- Class: Gastropoda
- Order: Cycloneritida
- Family: Neritidae
- Genus: Vitta
- Species: V. meleagris

Binomial name
- Vitta meleagris (Lamarck, 1822)

Synonyms
- Neritina meleagris Lamarck, 1822; Theodoxus meleagris (Lamarck, 1822) (unaccepted combination)

= Vitta meleagris =

Species of gastropod

Vitta meleagris is a species of sea snail, a marine gastropod mollusk in the family Neritidae.

== Distribution ==
This species occurs in rivers of the Dominican Republic.
