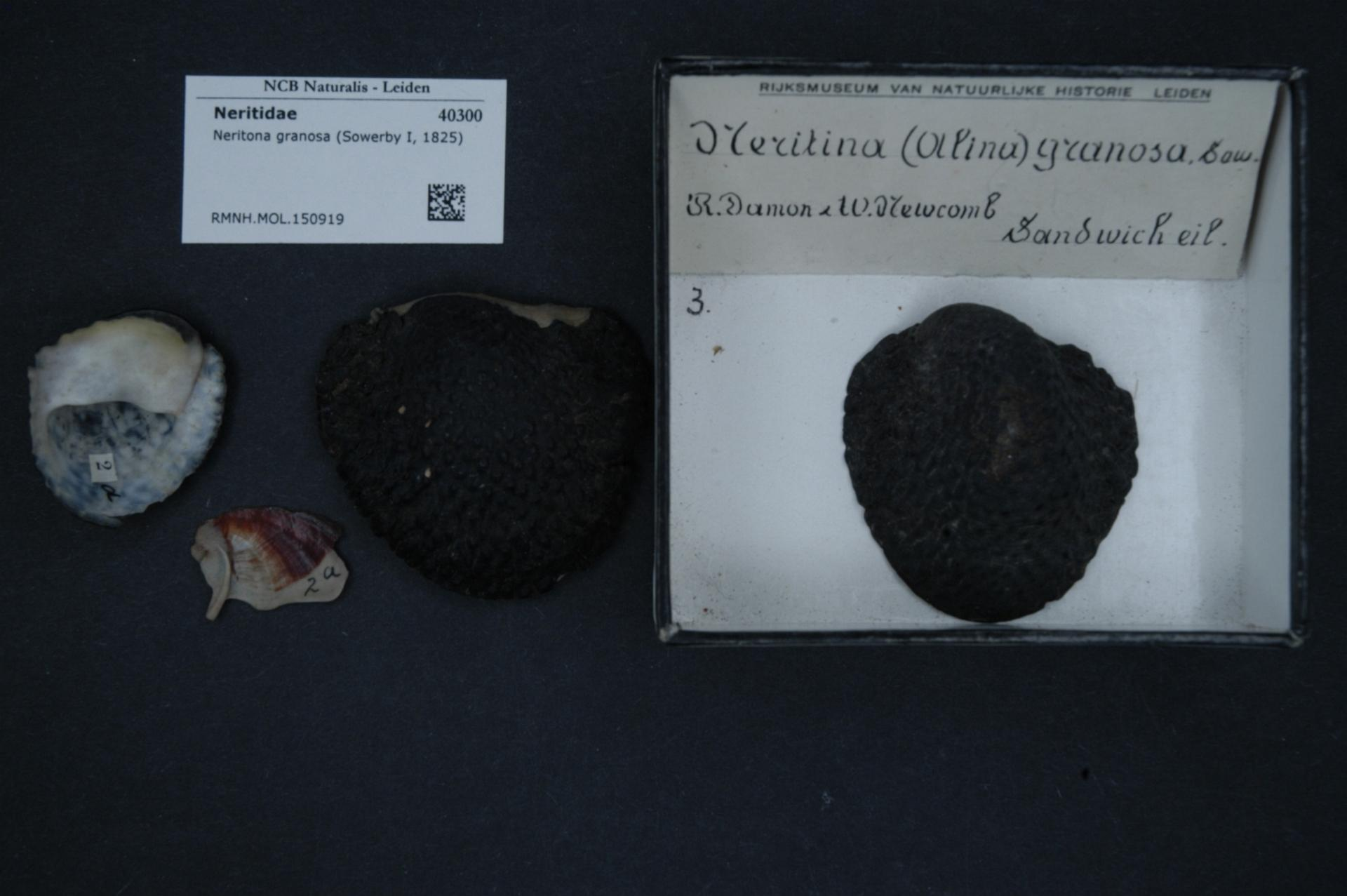
- Neritona Granosa Samples

Conservation status
- Vulnerable (IUCN 3.1)

- Critically Imperiled (NatureServe)

Scientific classification
- Kingdom: Animalia
- Phylum: Mollusca
- Class: Gastropoda
- Order: Cycloneritida
- Family: Neritidae
- Genus: Neritona
- Species: N. granosa

Binomial name
- Neritona granosa (Sowerby I, 1825)

Synonyms
- Neritina (Neripteron) gigas Lesson, 1842; Neritina (Neritona) gigas Lesson, 1842; Neritina (Neritona) granosa Sowerby I, 1825; Neritina (Neritona) papillosa Jay, 1839; Neritina gigas Lesson, 1842; Neritina granosa Sowerby I, 1825; Neritina papillosa Jay, 1839

= Neritona granosa =

Species of gastropod

Neritona granosa is a species of freshwater snail with an operculum, an aquatic gastropod mollusc in the family Neritidae.

== Distribution and habitat ==
These snails live in streams and once they find an area to take a stop, they stay in that district. Due to this idea, these snails thrive off of continually flowing streams. Often times, these snails are found in the lower or middle stream reaches. Hīhīwai can be found all throughout Hawaii, however as of lately, their range of habitats have been continuously deteriorating because of stream modifications. Currently, the snails appear to be compacted to fewer than 50 streams.

== Description ==
Neritona granosa has a shell with a bumpy surface. There are two different colors on the shell: the outside of the shell is black, and the inside of the shell is orange.

== Ecology ==
Neritina granosa lives in streams. This species has marine larvae that migrate into and up streams after a period of oceanic dispersal. Most likely, the planktonic larvae of this neritid snail disperse across the oceanic expanses that separate the main Hawaiian Islands, and thus it can colonize streams on any or all of these islands.

== Cultural significance and human use ==
The Hawaiian name of the species is "wī" and "hīhīwai". During ancient Hawaiian times, these snails functioned as a great source of food. Shells were also sold, and many of these shells came from the island of Molokai.

To this day, the Neritona granosa may sometimes appear in the Honolulu fish markets for around $3.60 a pound.

== Conservation ==
The International Union for Conservation of Nature has ranked N. granola as vulnerable to extinction. It likely does not occur in more than ten locations and is in decline. It historically occurred in Kauai, Maui, Molokai, Hawaii and Oahu but is presently confirmed from Maui, Hawaii, Kauai and Oahu. Major threats include obstruction of natural stream flow and inundation by saline water.

== Growth and lifespan ==
Hīhīwai may grow up to 9mm in a few months during its early life. Afterwards the growth rate takes a leap back slowing down the rapidly growing snails. They then shall grow up to a length of 2 inches. With this information the conclusion is that the snail has a lifespan of 6–10 years.

== Sources ==
- Ford, John Irven (1979). Biology of a Hawaiian Fluvial Gastropod: Neritina Granosa Sowerby (Prosobranchia: Neritidae) (Thesis). OCLC 6400196.
