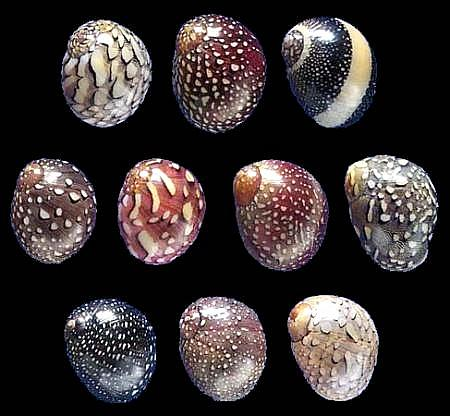
- Shells of Vitta virginea

Conservation status
- Least Concern (IUCN 3.1)

- Secure (NatureServe)

Scientific classification
- Kingdom: Animalia
- Phylum: Mollusca
- Class: Gastropoda
- Order: Cycloneritida
- Family: Neritidae
- Genus: Vitta
- Species: V. virginea

Binomial name
- Vitta virginea (Linnaeus, 1758)

Synonyms
- Nerita microstoma (d'Orbigny, 1842); Nerita usnea Röding, 1798; Neritina (Vitta) usnea (Röding, 1798); Neritina floridana Reeve, 1855; Neritina gravis Morelet, 1849; Neritina jamaicensis Adams, 1851; Neritina lineolata Lamarck, 1816; Neritina microstoma d'Orbigny, 1842; Neritina reclivata (Say, 1822); Neritina reclivata sphaera Pilsbry, 1931; Neritina reticulata De Cristofori & Jan, 1832; Neritina rotundata von Martens, 1865; Neritina sphaera Pilsbry, 1931; Neritina usnea (Röding, 1798); Theodoxus reclivatus Say, 1822

= Vitta virginea =

Vitta virginea Temporal range: Miocene - Recent

Species of gastropod

Vitta virginea, the virgin nerite, is a species of sea snail, a marine gastropod mollusk in the family Neritidae.

== Distribution ==
This species is widespread from the Bahamas, Bermuda, Cuba, West Indies, Greater and Lesser Antilles, Dominica, Puerto Rico, Central America (Panama, Guatemala, Costa Rica), Brazil, Venezuela, Suriname, Colombia, Mexico, Texas and Florida.

== Habitat ==
Vitta virginea can withstand large changes in salinity and therefore may live in fresh, sea or brackish water. These sea snails occur in rivers and streams, in estuaries and in the sea, on sand, silt and stones, brackish ponds and mangroves.

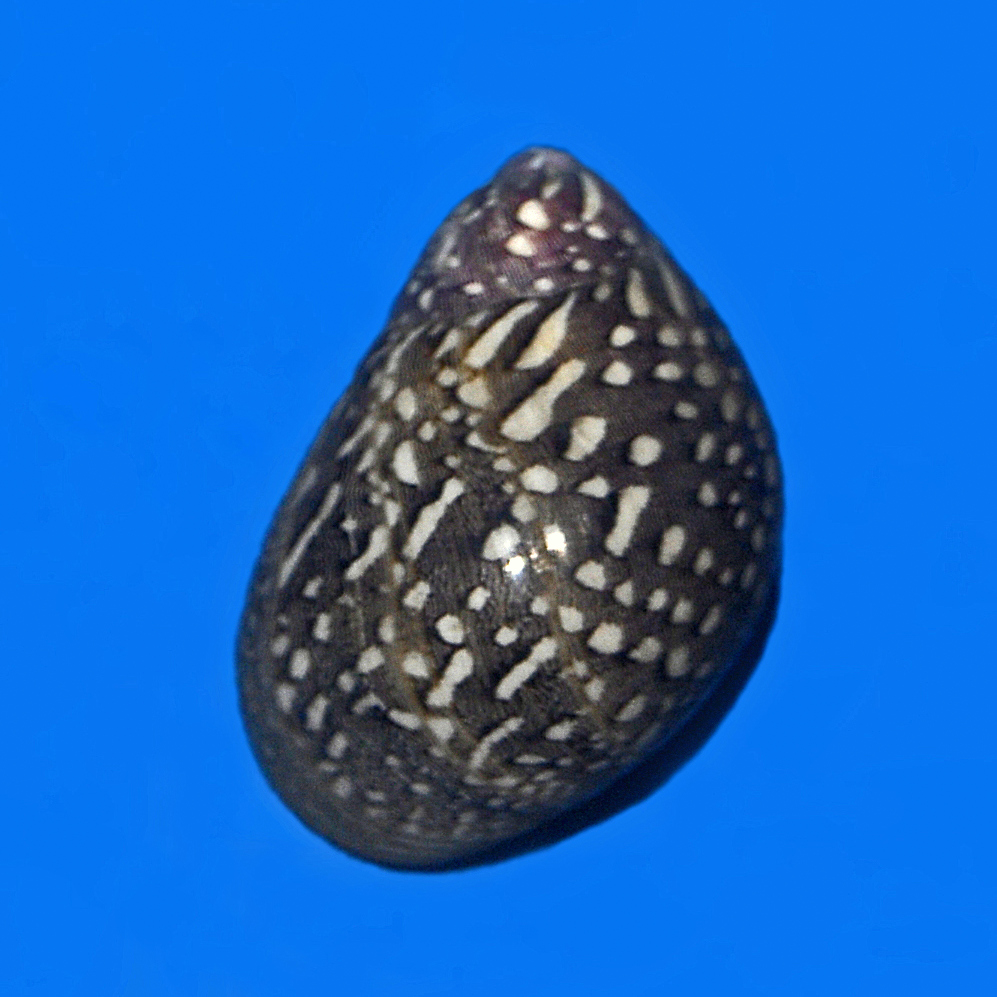
A shell of Vitta virginea from Barbados, on display at the Museo Civico di Storia Naturale di Milano

== Description ==
Shells of Vitta virginea can reach an average size of 6–25 millimetres (0.24–0.98 in). These colorful grass-flat snails show extremely variable pattern and color. They are semiglobular, with 3 or 4 whorls. The aperture is oval, with thin lips. Operculum is usually black. The polished shell surface may be black, grey or white, yellowish, olive, red and purple, with various stripes or waves, spots and lines.

== Biology ==
They are herbivorous (algae) and diadromous. They are involved in massive upstream migrations.

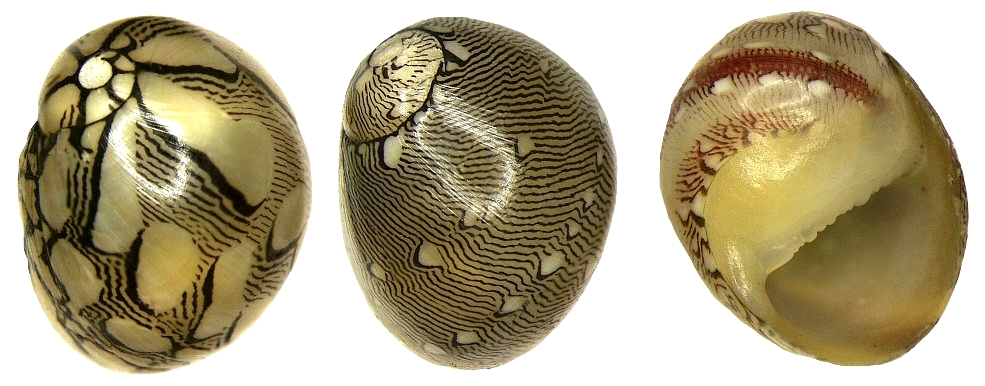
Shells of Vitta virginea

== Bibliography ==
- Blanco-Libreros JF, Arroyave-Rincón A. - Predator damage and shell size on the diadromous snail Neritina virginea (Gastropoda: Neritidae) in the Mameyes River, Puerto Rico
- Cordeiro, J. & Perez, K. 2012. Neritina virginea. The IUCN Red List of Threatened Species 2012: e.T189436A1925495.
- Pointier J.P. (ed.). (2015). Freshwater molluscs of Venezuela and their medical and veterinary importance. Harxheim: ConchBooks. 228 pp
- Turgeon, D. D., A. E. Bogan, E. V. Coan, W. K. Emerson, W. G. Lyons, W. Pratt, et al. (1988) Common and scientific names of aquatic invertebrates from the United States and Canada: mollusks, American Fisheries Society Special Publication 16
- Turgeon, D. D., J. F. Quinn Jr., A. E. Bogan, E. V. Coan, F. G. Hochberg, W. G. Lyons, et al. (1998) Common and scientific names of aquatic invertebrates from the United States and Canada: Mollusks, 2nd ed., American Fisheries Society Special Publication 26
- Eichhorst T.E. (2016). Neritidae of the world. Volume 2. Harxheim: Conchbooks. Pp. 696-1366
