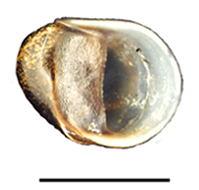
- Apertural view of a shell of Neritina iris. Scale bar is 10 mm.

Scientific classification
- Kingdom: Animalia
- Phylum: Mollusca
- Class: Gastropoda
- Order: Cycloneritida
- Family: Neritidae
- Genus: Neritina
- Species: N. iris

Binomial name
- Neritina iris Mousson, 1849

= Neritina iris =

Species of gastropod

Neritina iris is a species of sea snail, a marine gastropod mollusk in the family Neritidae.

== Distribution ==
Mayotte.

== Description ==
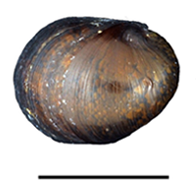
Abapertural view of a shell of Neritina iris. Scale bar is 10 mm.

== Human use ==
It is a part of ornamental pet trade for freshwater aquaria.
