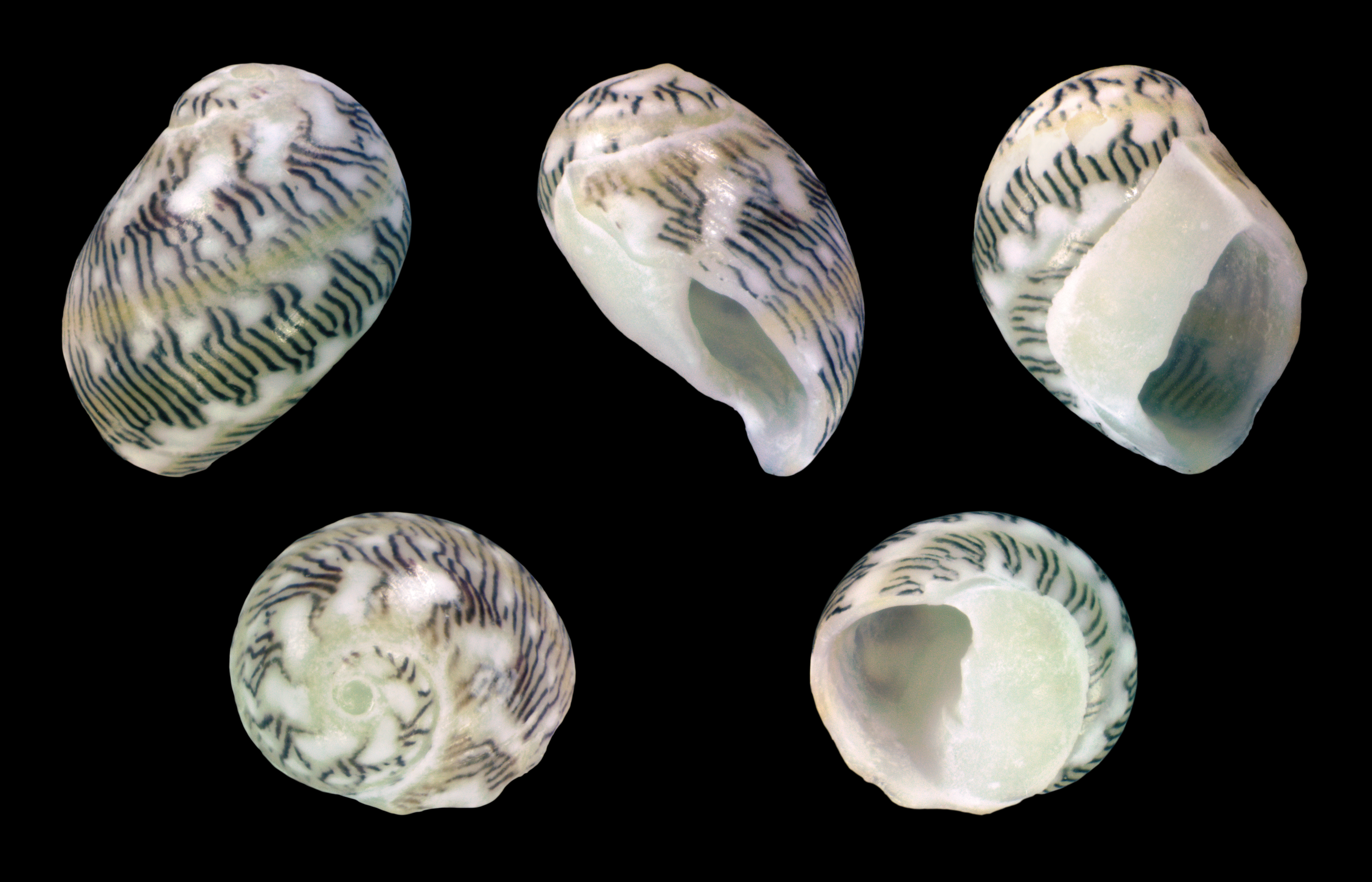
- With black lines (above), with red lines (below)
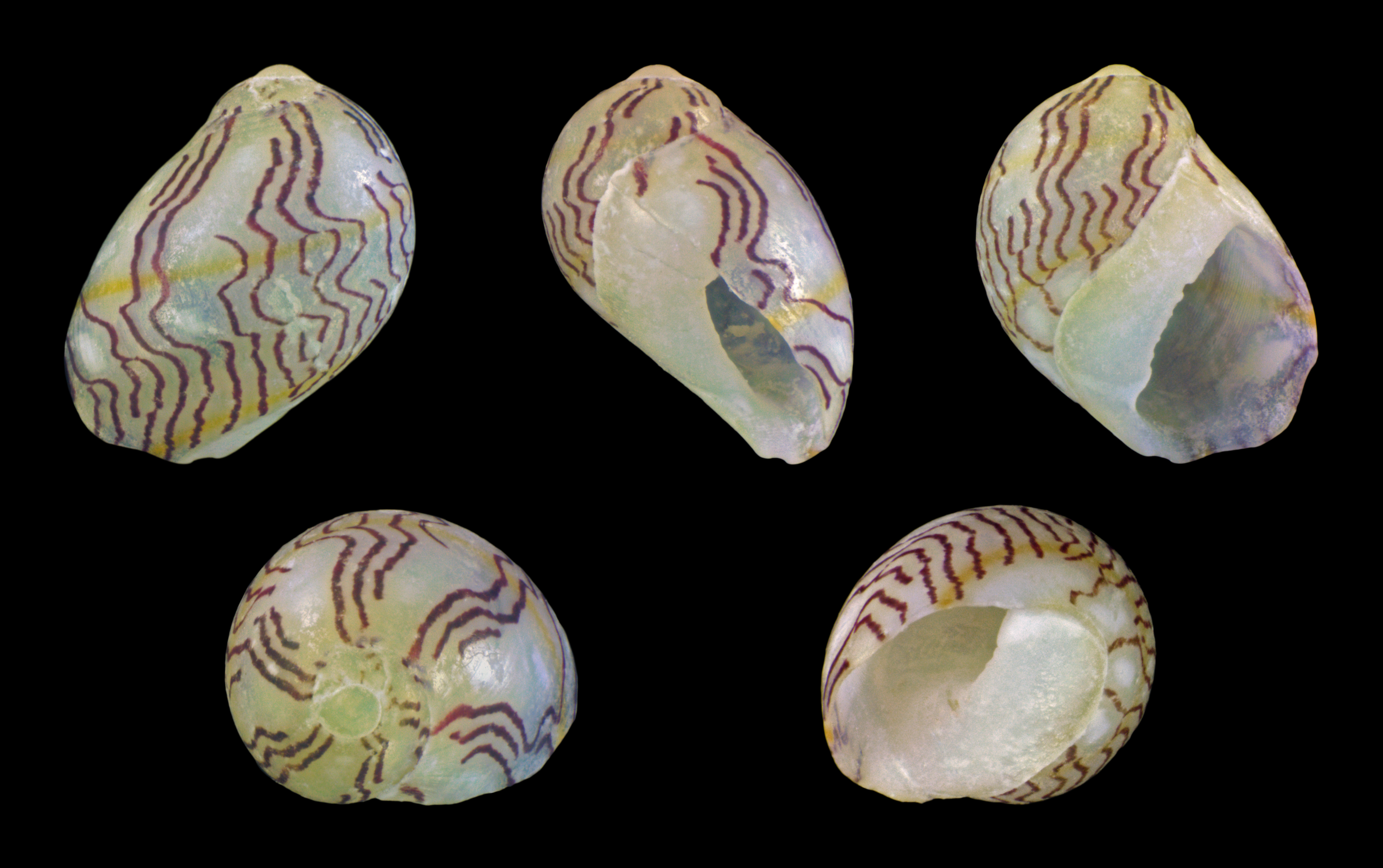

Scientific classification
- Kingdom: Animalia
- Phylum: Mollusca
- Class: Gastropoda
- Order: Cycloneritida
- Family: Neritidae
- Genus: Smaragdia
- Species: S. souverbiana

Binomial name
- Smaragdia souverbiana (Montrouzier, 1863)

Synonyms
- Neritina hellvillensis Crosse, 1881; Neritina pulcherrima Angas, 1871; Neritina semen Tapparone Canefri, 1875; Neritina souverbieana Montrouzier, 1863; Neritina souverbiana var. hellvillensis Crosse, 1881

= Smaragdia souverbiana =

Species of gastropod

Smaragdia souverbiana is a species of sea snail, a marine gastropod mollusk in the family Neritidae.

== Description ==
Smaragdia souverbiana is a small (<2mm aperture) seagrass associated Nerite. Its shell is sand to green in colour, with distinctive thin black bands with embedded clear diamonds across the whorls. It is commonly found in seagrasses, where it is believed to feed directly on seagrass cells (rather than algae epiphyte like many other seagrass associated gastropods). Feces examined from specimens collected from the intertidal zone contained both seagrass and epiphyte material.

== Distribution ==
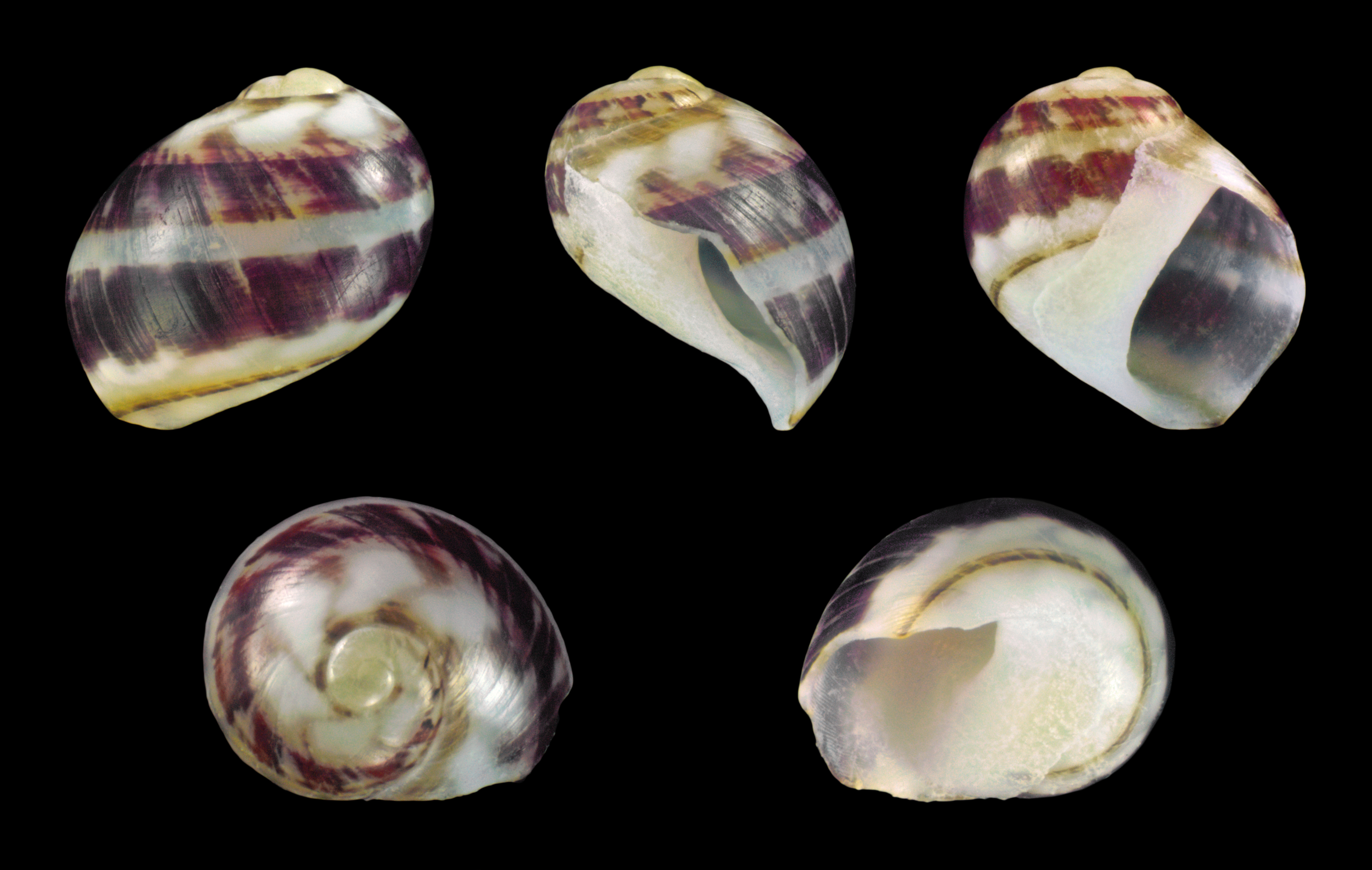
Banded form

This species is distributed in the Indian Ocean along Madagascar and the Aldabra Atoll, and in the Mediterranean Sea. It is also widely distributed throughout the Indo-Pacific, with records of its collection along the east (as far south as southern New South Wales) and west coasts for Australia, through Indonesia and Malaysia to the Philippines and New Caledonia.
