= Vitta rubricata =

Conservation status
- Near Threatened (IUCN 3.1)

Scientific classification
- Kingdom: Animalia
- Phylum: Mollusca
- Class: Gastropoda
- Order: Cycloneritida
- Family: Neritidae
- Genus: Vitta
- Species: V. rubricata

Binomial name
- Vitta rubricata (Morelet, 1858)

Synonyms
- Neritina rubricata Morelet, 1858 (original combination)

Species of gastropod

Vitta rubricata is a species of small freshwater snail with an operculum, an aquatic gastropod mollusk in the family Neritidae, the nerites.

== Distribution ==
This species is found in Africa, in Benin, Cameroon, Ivory Coast, Gabon, Gambia, Ghana, Guinea, Guinea-Bissau, Liberia, Nigeria, Senegal, Sierra Leone, and Togo.

== Habitat ==
This nerite lives in rivers.
