= Vitta glabrata =

Scientific classification
- Kingdom: Animalia
- Phylum: Mollusca
- Class: Gastropoda
- Order: Cycloneritida
- Family: Neritidae
- Genus: Vitta
- Species: V. glabrata

Binomial name
- Vitta glabrata (Sowerby II, 1849)

Synonyms
- Clithon glabrata [sic] (incorrect gender ending); Clithon glabratum (G. B. Sowerby II, 1849); Neritina glabrata G. B. Sowerby II, 1849

Species of gastropod

Vitta glabrata is a species of brackish water snail, a gastropod mollusk in the family Neritidae.

== Description ==
The length of the shell is 8.5 mm.

== Distribution ==
This species occurs in Africa from Gambia to Angola.
