= Vitta cristata =

Conservation status
- Least Concern (IUCN 3.1)

Scientific classification
- Kingdom: Animalia
- Phylum: Mollusca
- Class: Gastropoda
- Subclass: Neritimorpha
- Order: Cycloneritida
- Family: Neritidae
- Genus: Vitta
- Species: V. cristata

Binomial name
- Vitta cristata (Morelet, 1864)

Synonyms
- Neritina cristata Morelet, 1864 (original combination)

Species of gastropod

Vitta cristata is a species of small freshwater snail with an operculum, an aquatic gastropod mollusk in the family Neritidae, the nerites.

== Distribution ==
This species of nerite is found in Africa: in Cameroon, Ivory Coast, Gabon, and Sierra Leone.
