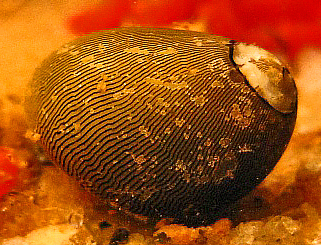
- A live individual

Conservation status
- Secure (NatureServe)

Scientific classification
- Kingdom: Animalia
- Phylum: Mollusca
- Class: Gastropoda
- Order: Cycloneritida
- Family: Neritidae
- Genus: Vitta
- Species: V. usnea

Binomial name
- Vitta usnea (Röding, 1798)

Synonyms
- Nerita microstoma (d'Orbigny, 1842); Nerita usnea Röding, 1798; Neritina (Vitta) usnea (Röding, 1798); Neritina floridana Reeve, 1855; Neritina gravis Morelet, 1849; Neritina jamaicensis Adams, 1851; Neritina lineolata Lamarck, 1816; Neritina microstoma d'Orbigny, 1842; Neritina reclivata (Say, 1822); Neritina reclivata sphaera Pilsbry, 1931; Neritina reticulata De Cristofori & Jan, 1832; Neritina rotundata von Martens, 1865; Neritina sphaera Pilsbry, 1931; Neritina usnea (Röding, 1798); Theodoxus reclivatus Say, 1822

= Vitta usnea =

Species of gastropod

Vitta usnea is a species of freshwater snail with an operculum, an aquatic gastropod mollusk in the family Neritidae, the nerites.

== Distribution ==
Vitta usnea, (common name olive nerite) is a euryhaline organism living at salinities ranging from 0 to 19 ppt. It feeds on epiphytic and epibenthic algae. It ranges from north Florida on the Atlantic Coast through the coastal waters of the Gulf of Mexico and the Caribbean Sea to Trinidad (Russell, 1941).

Vitta usnea lives in shallow protected bays from just above high water to approximately 1.5 meters in depth where it is found on sea grasses, emergent marsh plants, rocks, and stumps. It is known to climb up marsh grass blades at high tide to avoid predators. One such predator is the blue crab, Callinectes sapidus.

== Life cycle ==
The life span is 3–5 years in an aquarium.

== Human use ==
This species is used as algae-eating snail among freshwater aquarists. In an aquarium, the shell of this species grows 1.3-2.5 cm. This snail prefers an aquarium temperature of 22.2-25.6 °C.
