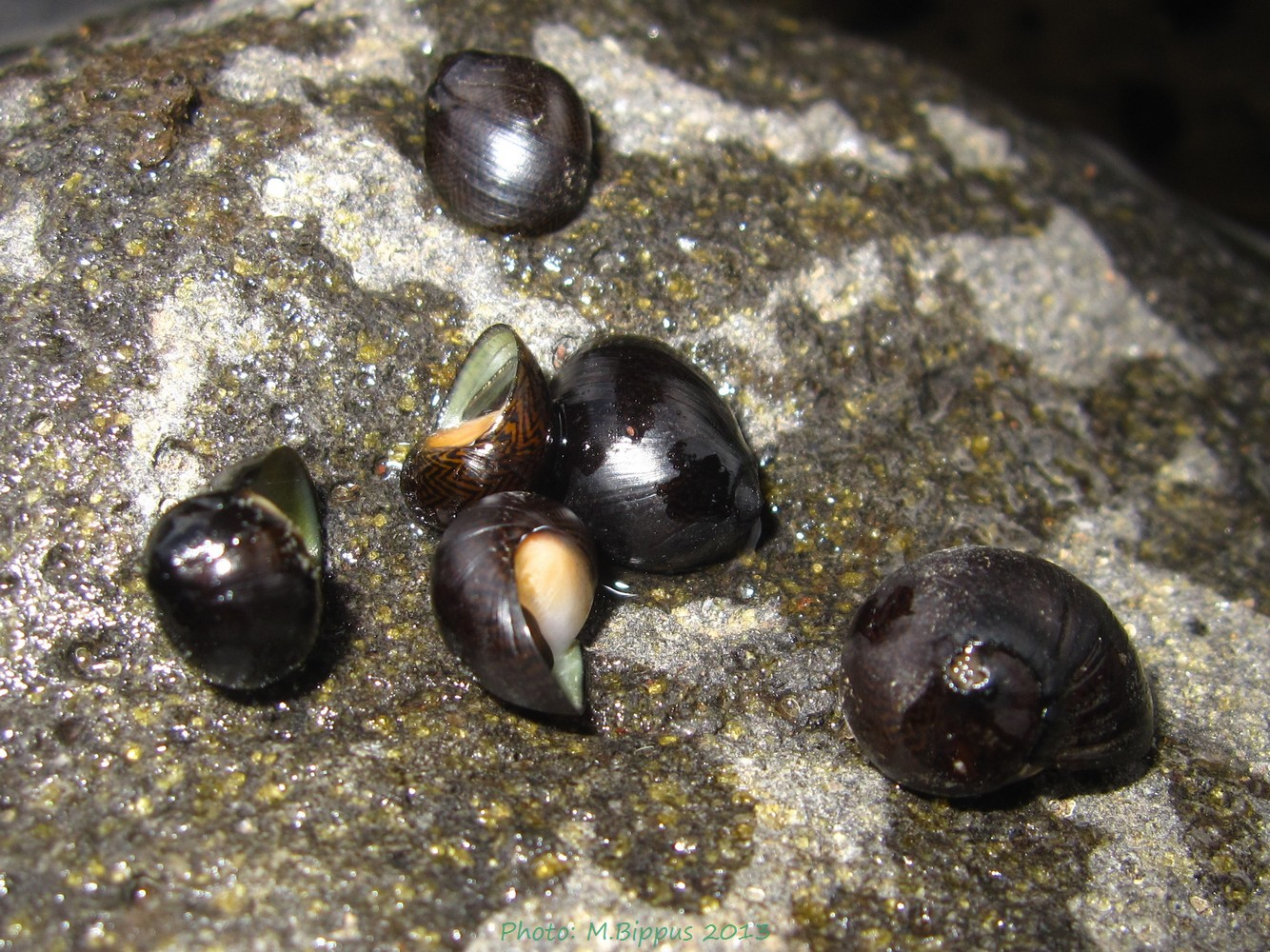

Scientific classification
- Kingdom: Animalia
- Phylum: Mollusca
- Class: Gastropoda
- Order: Cycloneritida
- Family: Neritidae
- Genus: Vittina
- Species: V. gagates

Binomial name
- Vittina gagates (Lamarck, 1815) or Lamarck, 1822

Synonyms
- Nerita reticulata Quoy & Gaimard, 1834; Neritina (Vittina) gagates Lamarck, 1822 (superseded combination); Neritina fulgurata Deshayes, 1863 (junior synonym); Neritina gagates Lamarck, 1822 (basionym); Neritina gagates var. minor E. von Martens, 1877; Neritina gagates var. subplanispira E. von Martens, 1877; Neritina modicella Deshayes, 1863 (junior synonym); Neritina moquiniana Récluz, 1850; Neritina sumatrensis G.B. Sowerby I, 1836; Neritina (Neritina) wetarana Haas, 1912

= Vittina gagates =

Species of gastropod

Vittina gagates is a species of sea snail, a marine gastropod mollusk in the family Neritidae.
