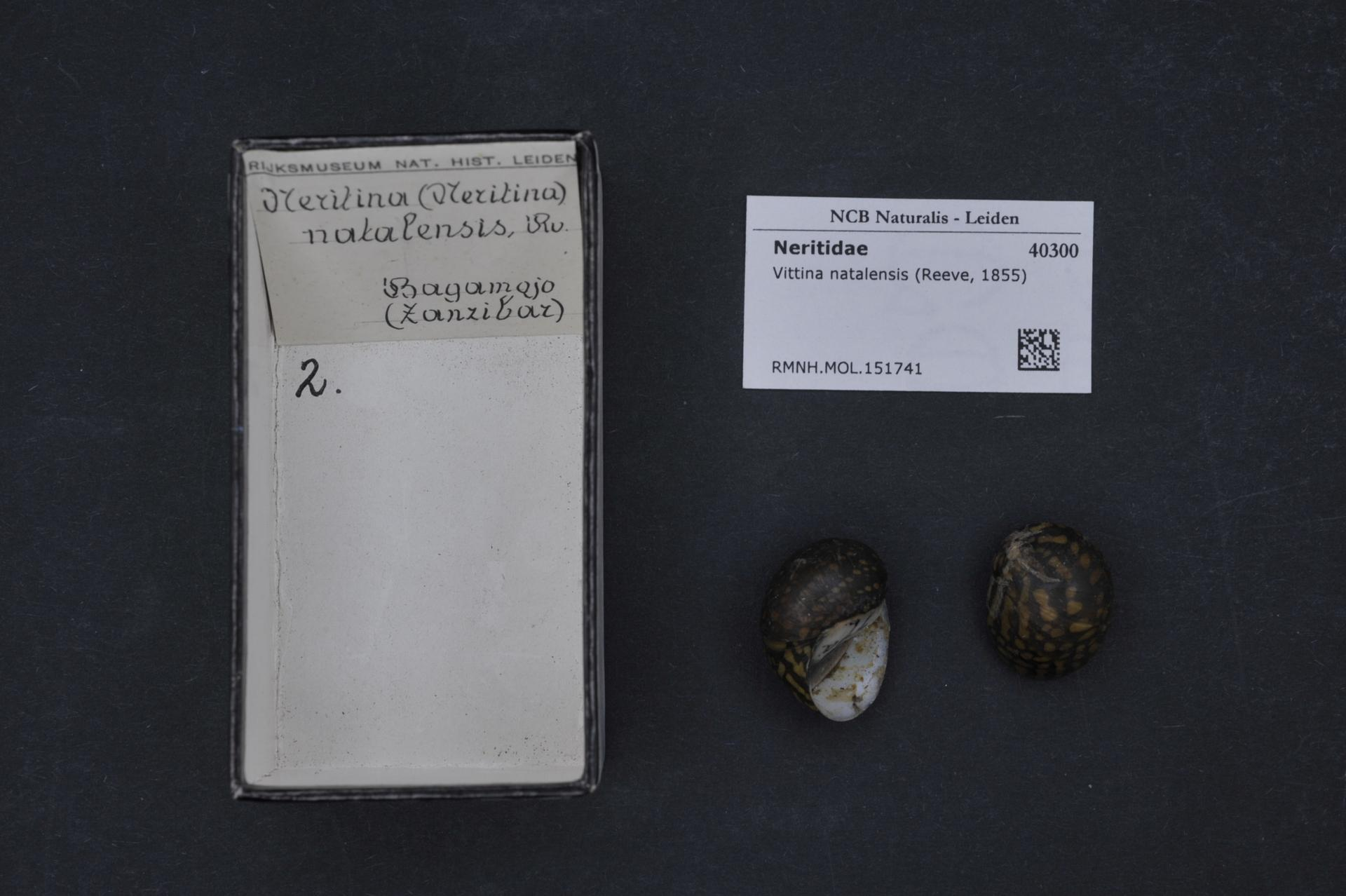
- Vittina natalensis shells

Conservation status
- Near Threatened (IUCN 3.1)

Scientific classification
- Kingdom: Animalia
- Phylum: Mollusca
- Class: Gastropoda
- Order: Cycloneritida
- Family: Neritidae
- Genus: Vittina
- Species: V. natalensis

Binomial name
- Vittina natalensis (Reeve, L.A., 1845)

Synonyms
- Neritina natalensis Reeve, 1856 (basionym); Theodoxus natalensis (Reeve, 1856) (superseded combination)

= Vittina natalensis =

Species of gastropod

Vittina natalensis, commonly known as spotted nerite, red spotted snail or zebra nerite, is a species of small freshwater snail with an operculum, an aquatic gastropod mollusk in the family Neritidae, the nerites. It returns to brackish waters to reproduce. This is a popular aquarium snail, sold because it looks attractive and eats algae in freshwater tanks, but can only reproduce in saltwater or brackish water conditions.

== Distribution ==
This species is endemic to the coastal plain of East Africa -- Kenya, Mozambique, Somalia, South Africa, and Tanzania. Its specific name natalensis refers to the region of Natal, South Africa.

== Human use ==
This species is a common choice of algae-eating snail among freshwater aquarists. In the aquarium trade, the striped shell of this species has caused it to be known as the tiger snail, zebra snail, or zebra nerite. (The name zebra nerite is however misleading, because there are several species of nerite that have that common name, including Puperita pupa, a small marine nerite from the tropical western Atlantic.) The stripes in some individuals may display as zigzags, dashes or spots. In an aquarium, the shell of this species grows to about 2.5 cm (one inch) in diameter. This snail prefers an aquarium temperature of 22 to 26 °C.

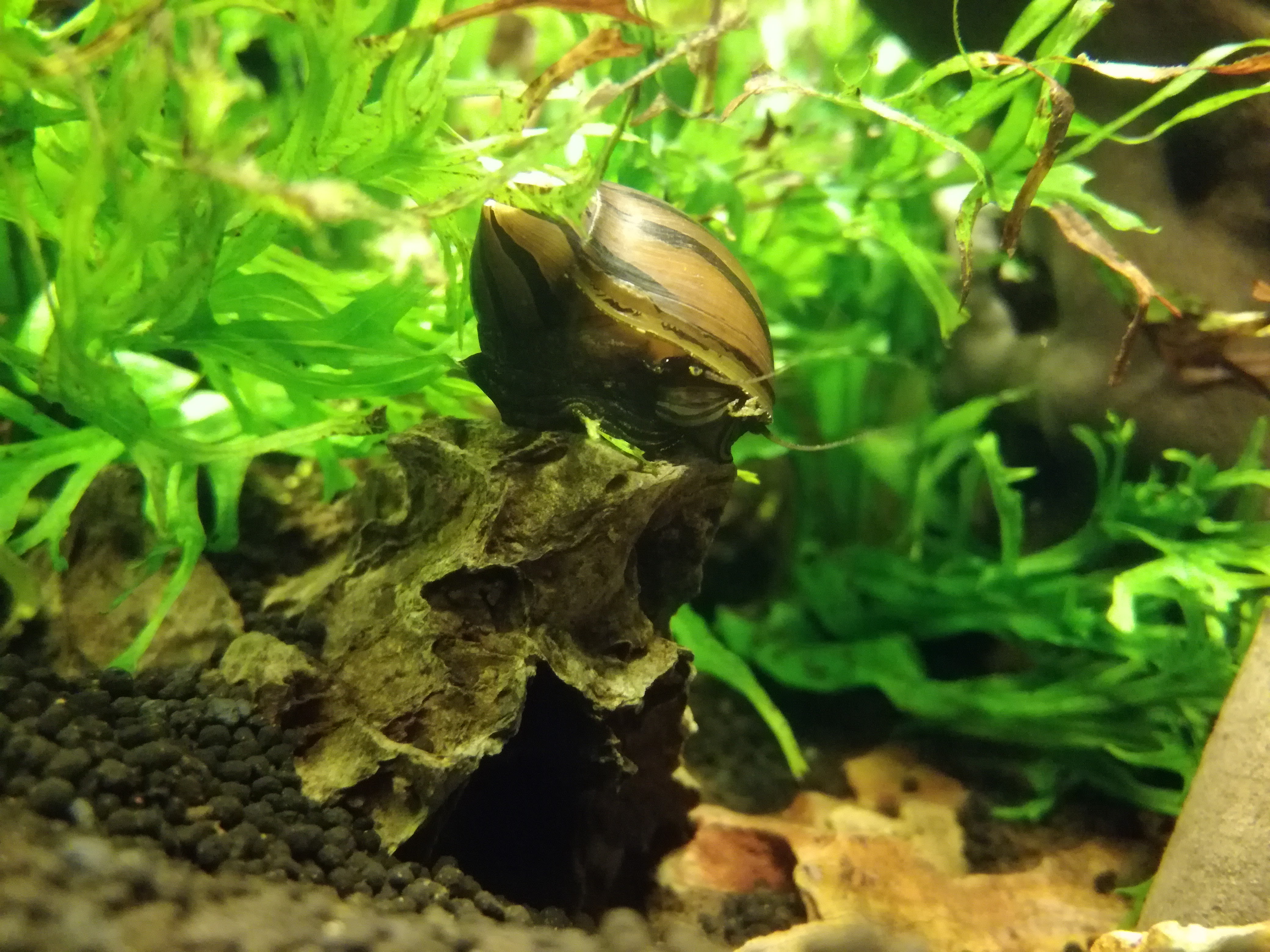
Vittina natalensis in an aquarium

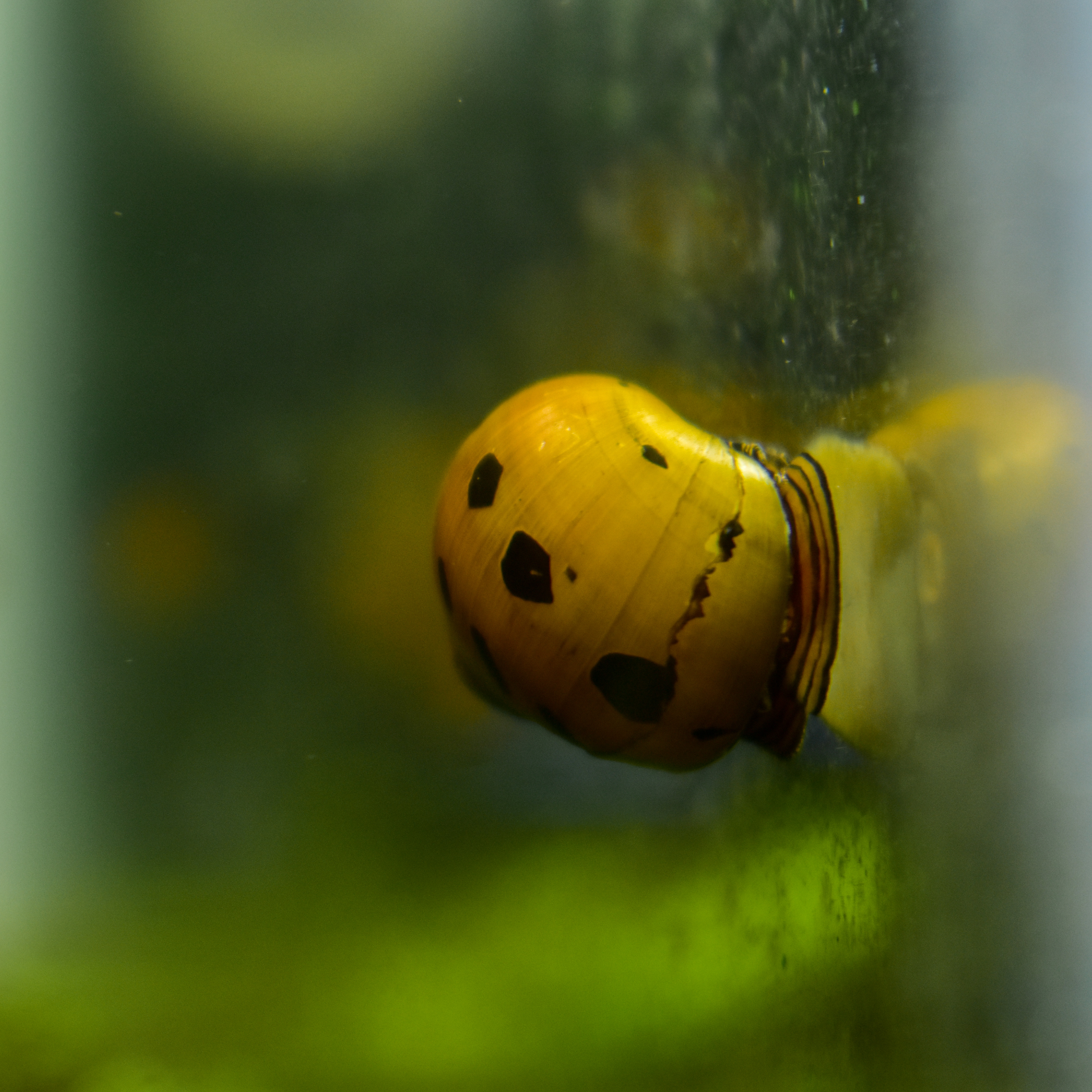
Vittina natalensis moving over aquarium glass
