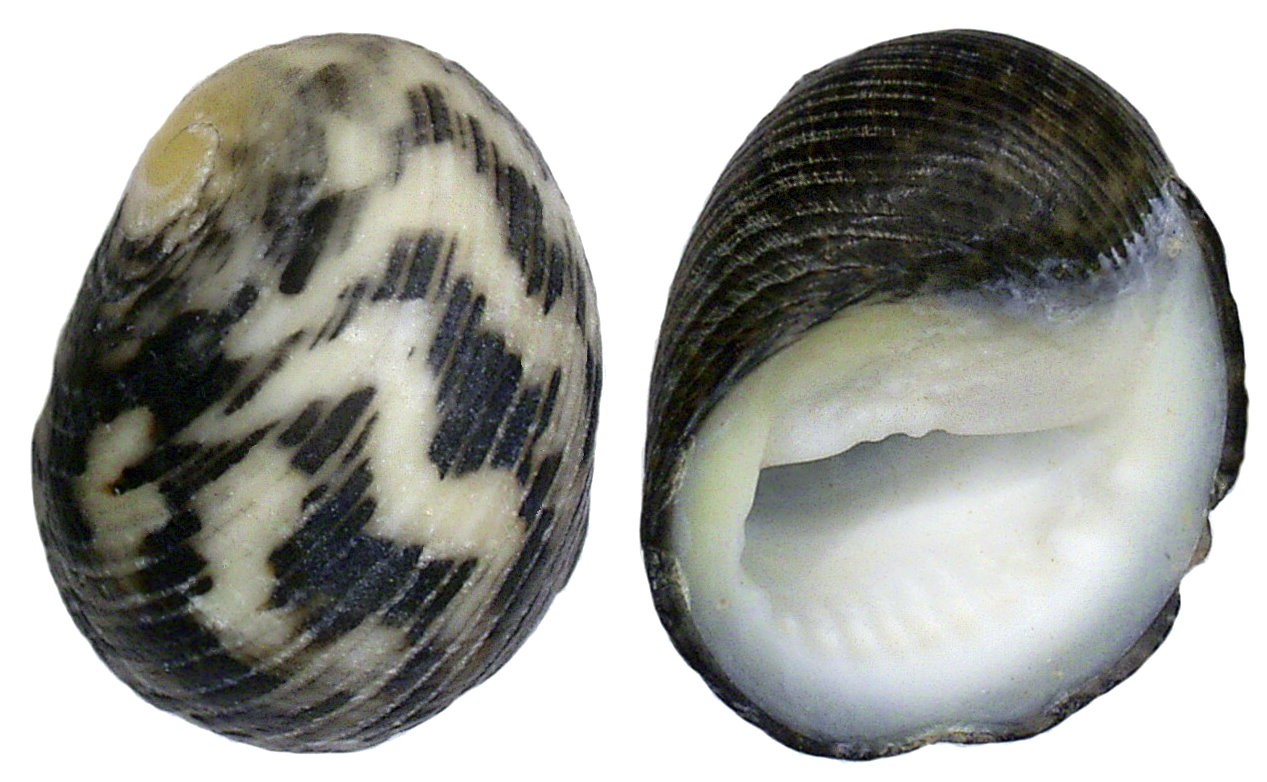

Scientific classification
- Kingdom: Animalia
- Phylum: Mollusca
- Class: Gastropoda
- Order: Cycloneritida
- Family: Neritidae
- Genus: Nerita
- Species: N. funiculata

Binomial name
- Nerita funiculata Menke, 1850

Synonyms
- Nerita bernhardi Recluz, 1850 (Note: Also cited as Recluz, 1855 or Reeve, 1855); Nerita fulgurans var. bernhardi (Recluz, 1850); Nerita cerostoma Troschel, 1852; Nerita excavata G. B. Sowerby II, 1883; Nerita genuana Reeve, 1855; Nerita granulata Reeve, 1855; Nerita regalis Hupé, 1858

= Nerita funiculata =

Nerita funiculata Temporal range: Late Miocene–Recent

Species of marine gastropod

Nerita funiculata, the funiculate nerite, is a species of marine gastropod in the family Neritidae found on the eastern Pacific coast.

== Description ==
Funiculate nerites usually grow to around 1.2 cm tall by 1.3 cm wide, but some specimens can grow to 1.8 by 1.95 cm. In colour they are black and sometimes splotchily variegated with a paler colour ranging from yellowed grey to orange. The shell is not quite spherical in shape and has a depressed spire.

== Classification ==
The species Nerita funiculata was named and scientifically described in 1850 by Karl Theodor Menke in a German article the title of which roughly translates to "Shells from Mazatlan, with critical notes". The article was published in the eleventh issue of the sixth volume of Zeitschrift für Malakozoologie, a monthly journal then edited by Menke and Ludwig Pfeiffer. N. funiculata is placed in the family Neritidae, a diverse group of snail species found in marine, brackish, and freshwater environments in the tropics and subtropics.

=== Synonyms ===
In the 1800s, numerous other Nerita species were described, only to be found to be synonymous with N. funiculata later on. In taxonomy, a synonym is a species determined to be the same as another, or as the ICZN terms it more formally, "each of two or more names of the same rank used to denote the same taxonomic taxon." The oldest name used to describe a species is said to be given priority; a name given later is termed a junior synonym. Objective synonyms are species which are synonymous because they were described from the same type material; while subjective synonyms are just that – subjective – up for debate and "only a matter of individual opinion" as to whether the two species are the same and thus synonymous.

==== Reeve's species ====
In his "Monograph of the genus Nerita", published in 1855, Lovell Augustus Reeve described two new species of Nerita, N. genuana, and N. granulata, which would later all be synonymized with N. funiculata, which had been described five years prior. (Note: These three species weren't the only ones described by Reeve that year; others, such as Nerita balteata, remain accepted species.) Reeve also validated the name N. bernhardi, which had been a nomen nudum. According to Leo George Hertlein and A.M. Strong in an article published in a 1955 Bulletin of the American Museum of Natural History, N. bernhardi had been "cited by Recluz in 1850 without a description or illustration. So far as we have ascertained, bernhardi was first described and illustrated by Reeve in 1855. It appears then that the first valid name for this species is Nerita funiculata Menke, dated November 11, 1850." N. funiculata being the first valid name for the species is important as that name thus gets taxonomic priority. The 1888 Manual of Conchology by George Tryon and Henry Pilsbry considered N. funiculata and genuana junior synonyms of "Nerita fulgurans var. bernhardi". The Manual described "var. bernhardi" as having colour varying from black to spotted with "yellowish grey or orange" and a shape somewhat flatter than N. fulgurans. This vague characterization roughly agrees with Reeve's more detailed description of N. bernhardi, which he wrote had a "rather depressed" shell with the "spire obtusely flattened" with colour "black, variegated with pale green, or yellowish dots". Hertlein and Strong's description of N. funiculata describes the species as having a roughly spherical shell, low spire, and having a colour that ranged from black to blotched with yellowish grey or orange. Indeed, Menke noted in his original description of N. funiculata that the species could appear with black variegation. He also wrote (in German): "At first glance, I considered this species, based on its size, inner lip, and colour, to be one of the countless forms of Ner. tessellata, especially since the tile-shaped leaflets that densely cover the ribs are lost through friction and age, and the outermost black layer of the shell also peels off in places, leaving the shell with white spots." Eduard von Martens, in his 1889 Die Gattungen Nerita und Neritopsis, distinguished between "Nerita Bernhardi", of which N. funiculata as described as Menke was a synonym, and N. funiculata as described by Reeve, which he considered a separate, valid species. Von Martens' N. Bernhardi was described as "blackish or obscurely buff, densely black-lined, with rare white spots", with a short spire, sub-spherical shape, and from eighteen to twenty four prominent ribs, while the species he accepted as N. funiculata was sub-spherical, more densely ribbed (30 to 35 narrow, darker ribs), had a prominent spire and was "dull, earth-colored gray-brown, with sparse, lighter, small spots.".

Henry Drummond Russell, in his 1940 PhD dissertation, proposed N. genuana be made a synonym of N. funiculata, as he noted that it "coincides" with Menke's species "in color, shape, and size", although the 1888 Manual already considered the two species synonymous, predating Russell by half a century. Reeve and von Martens both described N. genuana as a "jet-black species" with two prominent yellow or pink bands; like N. bernhardi, N. genuana had a "rather depressed" shell with a flattened spire. Nerita granulata, meanwhile, was still an accepted species in 1887, according to G. B. Sowerby II, and the 1888 Manual of Conchology accepted it and gives a one-sentence description. Today N. granulata is accepted as a synonym of N. funiculata.

==== The three other synonymous names ====
Three other species of Nerita were described in the 1800s which have since been found to be synonymous with N. funiculata. Nerita cerostoma was described by Franz Troschel in 1852. Troschel's new species, published in Archiv für Naturgeschichte, was black, had 22 ribs, and a short spire. The species was accepted by Tryon and Pilsbry (1888), von Martens (1889), and Dall (1910), but is now regarded as another junior subjective synonym. Nerita excavata, now considered a synonym, was described by Sowerby in 1883; the Manual of Conchology of 1888 accepted it but quietly noted that it was "apparently not very different from N. granulata, Reeve". Nerita regalis, described by Hupé in 1858, is also a synonym; it is not mentioned in Tryon and Pilsbry nor in von Martens.

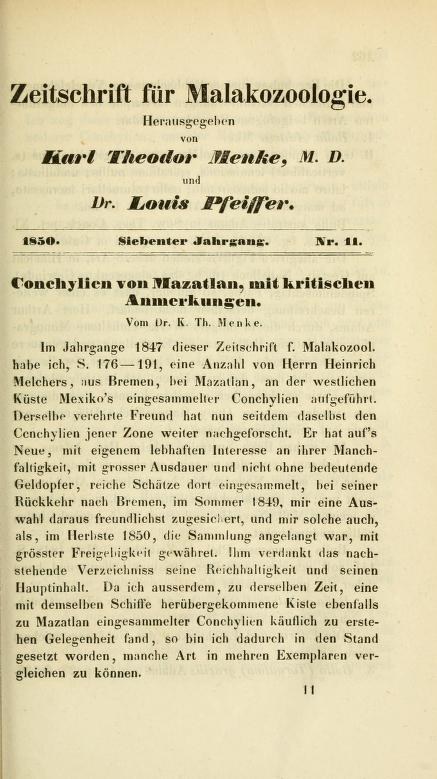
Title page of Menke's journal article in 1850 which included the original description of Nerita funiculata.

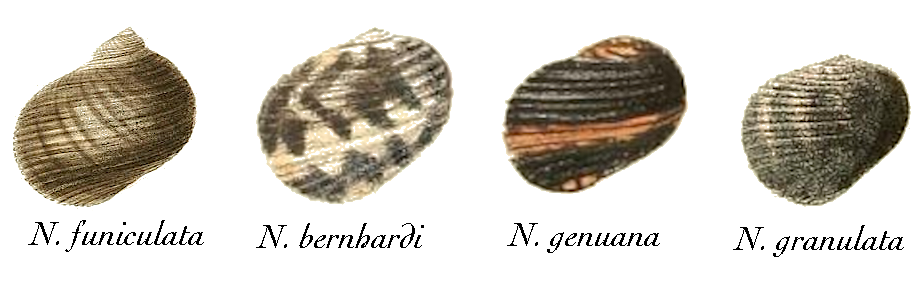
Comparison of N. funiculata (as circumscribed and drawn by Reeve), and his illustrations of the three species he described which were later synonymized with N. funiculata.

N. funiculata is sometimes called the "funiculate nerite", while Reeve called it the "corded nerite".

== Distribution ==
Nerita funiculata is distributed from Peru north to the upper tip of the Gulf of California and around Cocos Island. N. funiculata is also found in the Galápagos Islands: it has been observed in waters around Isla Santiago, Isla Santa Cruz, Isla Marchena, Isla de San Cristóbal, and Isla Genovesa, but not the archipelago's largest island, Isla Isabela.

== Fossils ==
N. funiculata fossils have been found dating to the Pliocene epoch, and to the Late Miocene sub-epoch.

== Sources ==
- Reeve, Lovell Augustus (1856). "Monograph of the genus Nerita". Conchologia Iconica. Vol. 9.
- Finet, Yves (1995). Marine Molluscs of the Galapagos: Gastropods: a Monograph and Revision of the Families Trochidae, Skeneidae, Turbinidae, and Neritidae. Vol. 1. L'Informatore Piceno. ISBN 978-88-86070-24-9.
- Hertlein, Leo George; Strong, A. M. (November 28, 1955). "Marine mollusks collected during the "Askoy" Expedition to Panama, Colombia, and Ecuador in 1941". Bulletin of the American Museum of Natural History. 107.
- Menke, Karl Theodor (1850). "Conchylien von Mazatlan, mit kritischen Anmerkungen" [Shells from Mazatlan, with critical notes.]. Zeitschrift für Malakozoologie (in German).
- Russell, Henry Drummond (1940). The Recent Neritidae of the West Indian Region (Doctor of Philosophy thesis). Boston University.
- Sowerby, George Brettingham (1887). Thesaurus Conchyliorum or Monographs of Genera of Shells. Vol. 5.
- Tryon, George Washington; Pilsbry, Henry Augustus (1888). "Family Neritidae". Manual of Conchology Structural and Systematic: Neritidae, Adeorbiidae, Cyclostrematidae, Liothiidae, Phasianellidae, Turbinidae, Trochidae, Stomatiidae, Haliotidae, Pleurotomariidae. Author, Academy of Natural Sciences.
- von Martens, Eduard (1889). Die Gattungen Nerita und Neritopsis. Bauer & Raspe.
