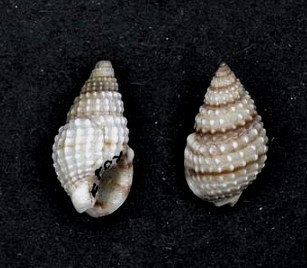
- Two views of a shell of Nassarius pyrrhus

Scientific classification
- Kingdom: Animalia
- Phylum: Mollusca
- Class: Gastropoda
- Subclass: Caenogastropoda
- Order: Neogastropoda
- Family: Nassariidae
- Genus: Nassarius
- Species: N. pyrrhus

Binomial name
- Nassarius pyrrhus (Menke, 1843)

Synonyms
- Alectrion victorianus Iredale, 1916; Arcularia victoriana (Iredale, 1916); Buccinum fasciatum Lamarck, 1822 (invalid: junior homonym of Buccinum fasciatum G. Fischer, 1807); Buccinum jacksonianum Kiener, 1834 (invalid: junior homonym of Buccinum jacksonianum Quoy & Gaimard, 1833); Buccinum pyrrhum Menke, 1843 (original combination); Nassa (Tritia) dealbata A. Adams, 1853; Nassa dealbata A. Adams, 1853; Nassa fasciata (Lamarck, 1822); Nassarius (Zeuxis) pyrrhus (Menke, 1843) · accepted, alternate representation; Nassarius dealbatus (A. Adams, 1853); Nassarius victorianus (Iredale, 1916); Niotha pyrrhus (Menke, 1843)

= Nassarius pyrrhus =

Species of gastropod

Nassarius pyrrhus, common name the red-banded nassa, is a species of sea snail, a marine gastropod mollusc in the family Nassariidae, the nassa mud snails or dog whelks.

== Description ==
The length of the shell varies between 14 mm and 22 mm.

The shell is ovate and conical. The spire is short, pointed, composed of seven or eight convex whorls. These are noduled at their upper part, ornamented upon their whole external surface with slightly undulated longitudinal folds. Often the folds upon the body whorl disappear partially upon the edge of the outer lip, and this whorl presents at its base a few striae which intersect the folds crosswise, and thus form granulations. The whitish aperture is subrotund and a little narrowed above. The thick outer lip is accompanied by a slightly prominent external varix. The internal part of the lip is marked with numerous fine striae.

== Distribution ==
This species is endemic to Australia and occurs off New South Wales, South Australia, Tasmania, Victoria, Western Australia.
