= Petasina filicina =

Conservation status
- Least Concern (IUCN 3.1)

Scientific classification
- Kingdom: Animalia
- Phylum: Mollusca
- Class: Gastropoda
- Order: Stylommatophora
- Family: Hygromiidae
- Genus: Petasina
- Species: P. filicina

Binomial name
- Petasina filicina (Pfeiffer, 1841)

Synonyms
- Helix filicina Pfeiffer, 1841

Species of gastropod

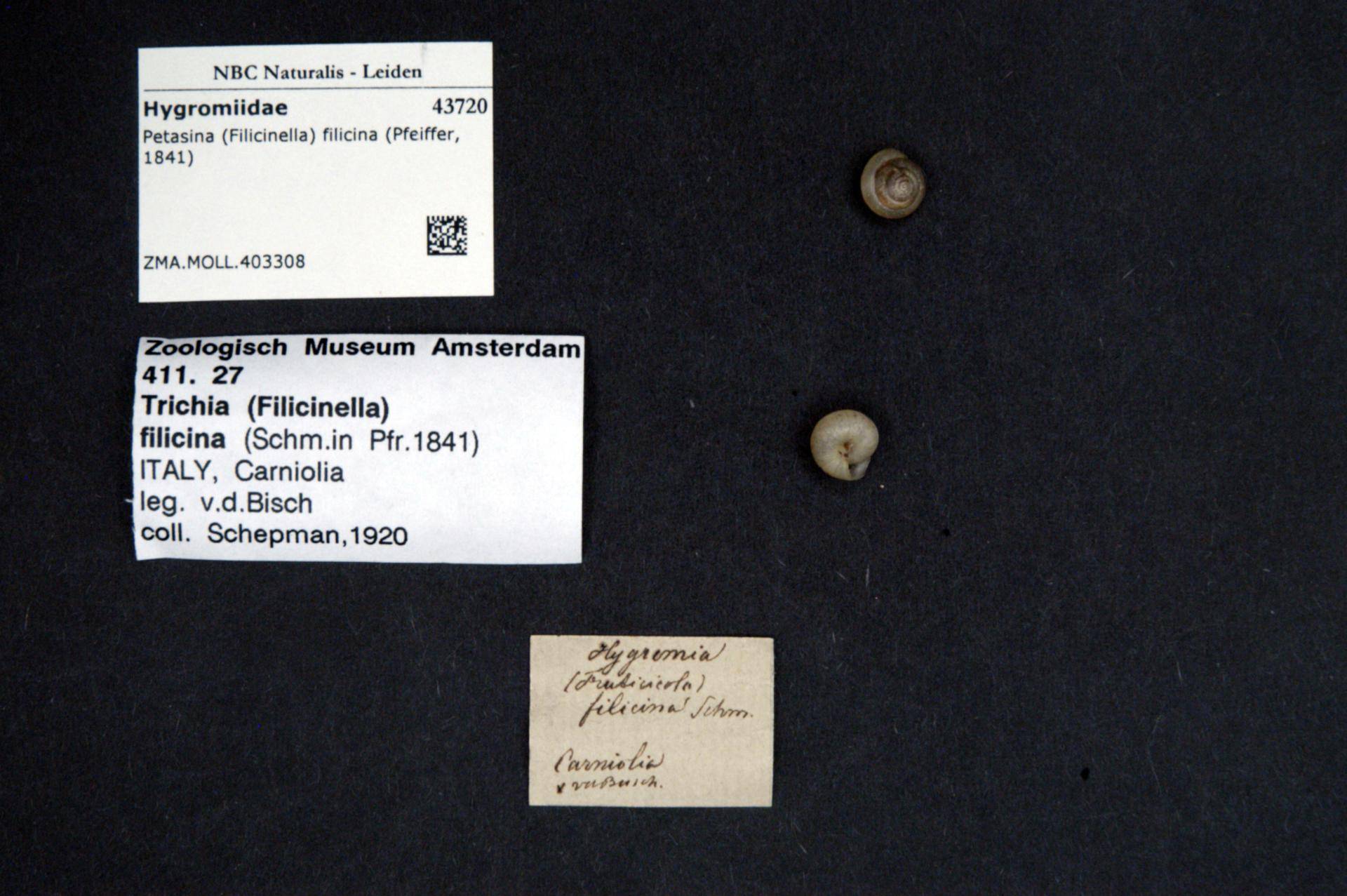
Petasina (Filicinella) filicina (Pfeiffer, 1841)

Petasina filicina is a species of air-breathing land snail, a terrestrial pulmonate gastropod mollusc in the family Hygromiidae, the hairy snails and their allies.

== Distribution ==
Distribution of this species is eastern-Alpine.

- Slovakia
