= Petasina bielzi =

Scientific classification
- Domain: Eukaryota
- Kingdom: Animalia
- Phylum: Mollusca
- Class: Gastropoda
- Order: Stylommatophora
- Family: Hygromiidae
- Genus: Petasina
- Species: P. bielzi

Binomial name
- Petasina bielzi (E.A. Bielz, 1860)

Synonyms
- Trichia bielzi (E.A. Bielz, 1860)

Species of gastropod

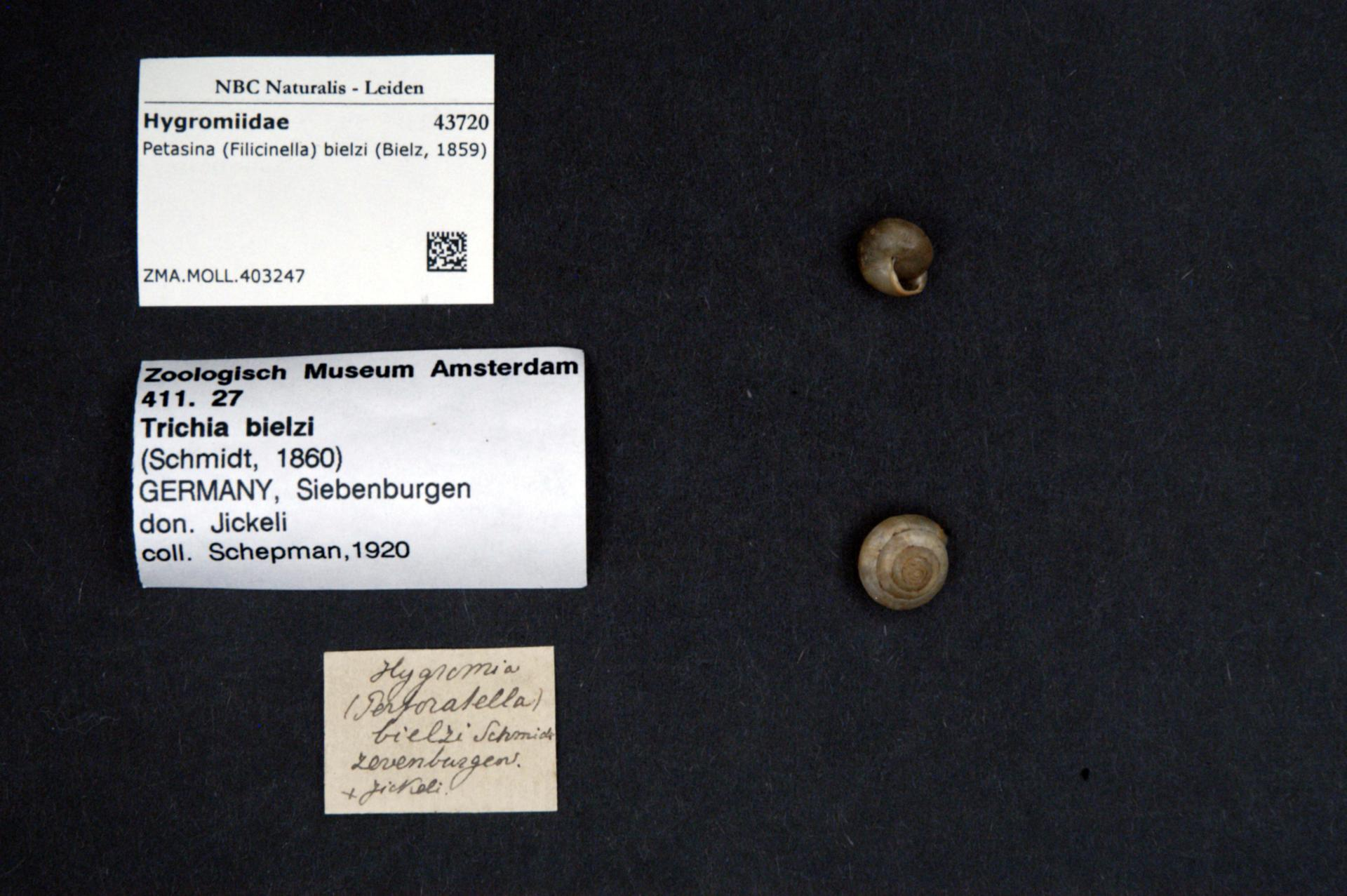

Petasina bielzi is a species of air-breathing land snail, a terrestrial pulmonate gastropod mollusc in the family Hygromiidae.

== Distribution ==
Distribution of this species is Eastern-Carpathian.

- Slovakia
- Ukraine
