= Petasina subtecta =

Conservation status
- Near Threatened (IUCN 3.1)

Scientific classification
- Kingdom: Animalia
- Phylum: Mollusca
- Class: Gastropoda
- Order: Stylommatophora
- Family: Hygromiidae
- Genus: Petasina
- Species: P. subtecta

Binomial name
- Petasina subtecta (Polinski, 1929)

Synonyms
- Fruticicola (Petasina) unidentata unidentata natio subtecta Polinski, 1929

Species of gastropod

Petasina subtecta is a species of air-breathing land snail, a terrestrial pulmonate gastropod mollusc in the family Hygromiidae, the hairy snails and their allies. This species is endemic to Austria.
