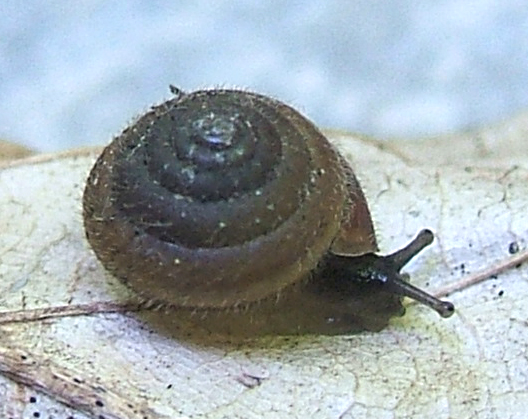
- A live individual of Petasina unidentata from Bayern

Scientific classification
- Kingdom: Animalia
- Phylum: Mollusca
- Class: Gastropoda
- Order: Stylommatophora
- Family: Hygromiidae
- Genus: Petasina
- Species: P. unidentata

Binomial name
- Petasina unidentata (Draparnaud, 1805)

Synonyms
- Helix unidentata Draparnaud, 1805

= Petasina unidentata =

Species of gastropod

Petasina unidentata is a species of air-breathing land snail, a terrestrial pulmonate gastropod mollusc in the family Hygromiidae, the hairy snails and their allies.

== Shell description ==
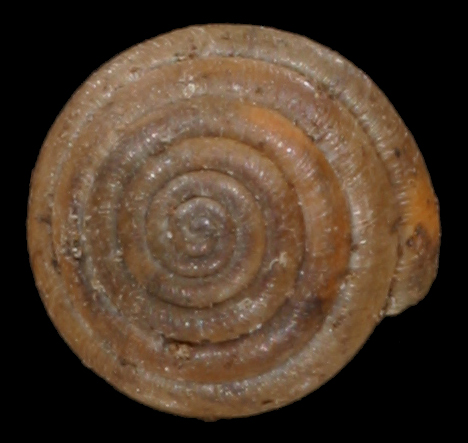
Apical view

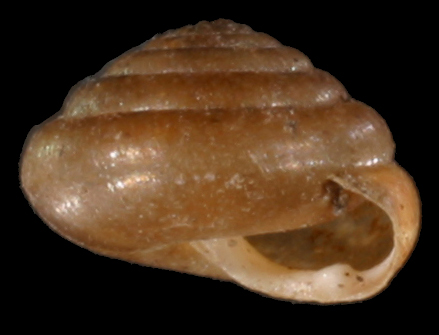
Apertural view

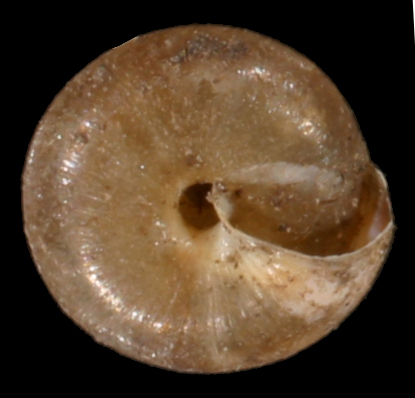
Basal view
