= Friedrich Ludwig Kreysig =

German physician (1770-1839)

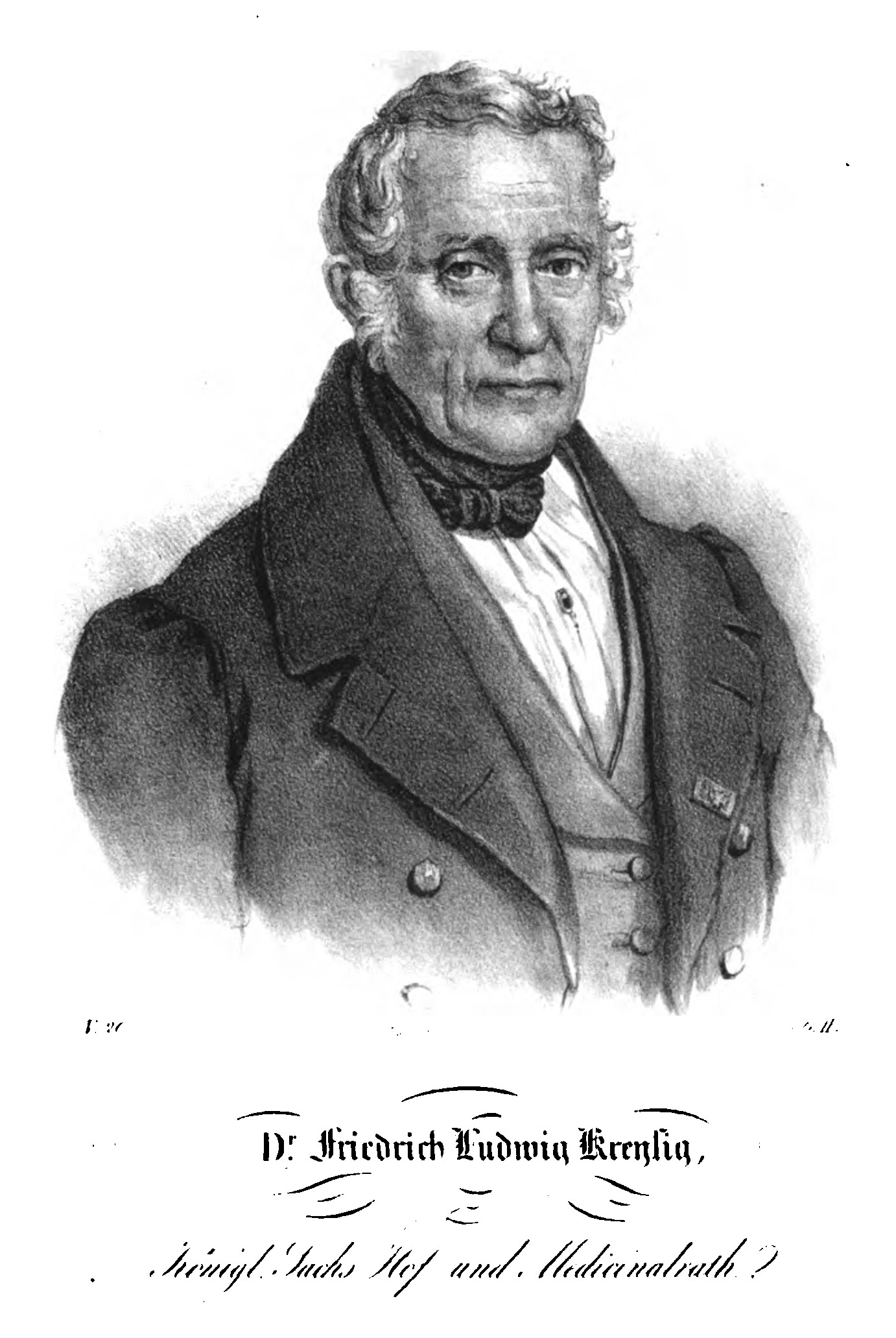
Friedrich Ludwig Kreysig (1770–1839)

Friedrich Ludwig Kreysig (7 July 1770 – 4 June 1839) was a German medical doctor born in Eilenburg.

In 1795 he received his medical doctorate from the University of Leipzig, and during the following year served as a substitute to Johann Gottfried Leonhardi (1746–1823) at the University of Wittenberg. In 1801 he became a professor of anatomy and botany at Wittenberg.

In 1803 he was appointed personal physician to Frederick Augustus, and from 1815 served in Dresden as a trainer of Saxon military doctors. For health reasons, he left academic work in 1822, retiring to a private practice, from which he concentrated on botanical studies.

Kreysig is largely known for his work with cardiological diseases. In 1815 he explained inflammatory processes associated with endocarditis. With physician Ernst Ludwig Heim (1747–1834), the "Heim-Kreysig sign" is named, which in adherent pericardium, an in-drawing of the intercostal space occurs, synchronous with the cardiac systole.

In 1828, he was elected a foreign member of the Royal Swedish Academy of Sciences.

Kreysig died in Dresden.

== Selected written works ==
- Aristotelis de soni ed vocis humanae natura atque ortu theoria cum recentiorum decretis comparata, Leipzig 1793
- De peripneumonia nervosa s. maligna commentatio, Leipzig 1796
- Neue Darstellung der physiologischen und pathologischen Grundlehren (New representation of physiological and pathological basic teachings), Leipzig 1798–1800
- Abhandlung über das Scharlachfieber, nebst Beschreibung einer sehr bösartigen epidemischen Frieselkrankheit, welche im Februar 1801 in Wittenberg herrschte (Essay on scarlet fever, etc.), Leipzig 1802
- Die Krankheiten des Herzens, systematisch bearbeitet und durch eigenen Beobachtungen erläutert (Diseases of the heart, etc.), Berlin (1814–1817, four volumes)
- System der praktischen Heilkunde, usw (System of Practical Medicine); Leipzig und Altenburg, (1818–1819, two volumes)
- Über den Gebrauch der Mineralwässer von Karlsbad, Ems, usw (On the usage of mineral waters of Karlsbad, Ems, etc.), Leipzig 1825
