= Petasina bakowskii =

Scientific classification
- Domain: Eukaryota
- Kingdom: Animalia
- Phylum: Mollusca
- Class: Gastropoda
- Order: Stylommatophora
- Family: Hygromiidae
- Genus: Petasina
- Species: P. bakowskii

Binomial name
- Petasina bakowskii (Poliński, 1924)

Species of mollusc

Petasina bakowskii is a species of air-breathing land snail, a terrestrial pulmonate gastropod mollusc in the family Hygromiidae, the hairy snails and their allies.

== Distribution ==
This species occurs in Slovakia, Ukraine and other countries.
