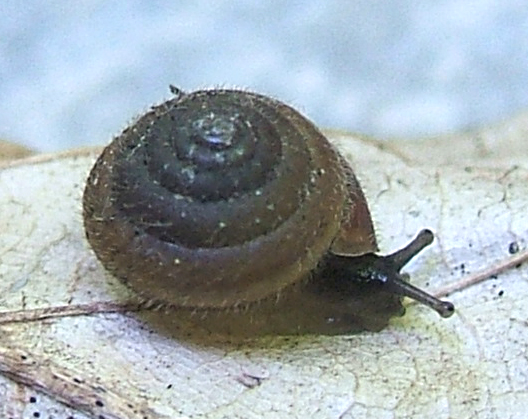
- A live individual of Petasina unidentata

Scientific classification
- Kingdom: Animalia
- Phylum: Mollusca
- Class: Gastropoda
- Order: Stylommatophora
- Family: Hygromiidae
- Subfamily: Trochulininae
- Tribe: Trochulini
- Genus: Petasina; Beck, 1847

= Petasina =

Genus of gastropods

Petasina is a genus of air-breathing land snails, terrestrial animal pulmonate gastropod mollusks in the family Hygromiidae (the hairy snails and their allies).

== Species ==
This genus contains the following species:

- Petasina bakowskii (Polinski, 1924)
- Petasina bielzi (Bielz, 1860)
- Petasina edentula (Draparnaud, 1805)
- Petasina filicina (Pfeiffer, 1841)
- Petasina leucozona (Pfeiffer, 1828)
- Petasina lurida (Pfeiffer, 1828)
- Petasina subtecta (Polinski, 1929)
- Petasina unidentata (Draparnaud, 1805) - type species
