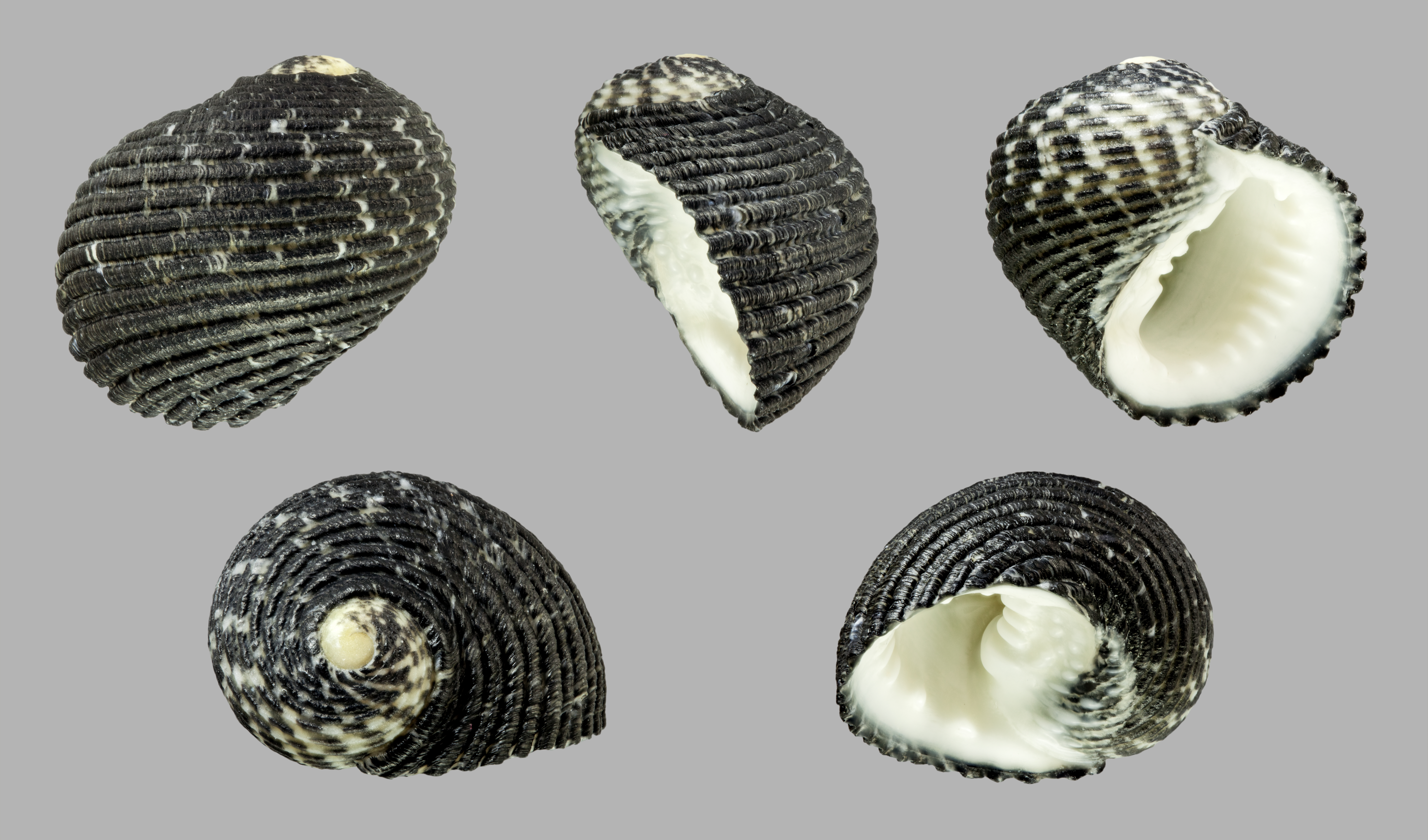

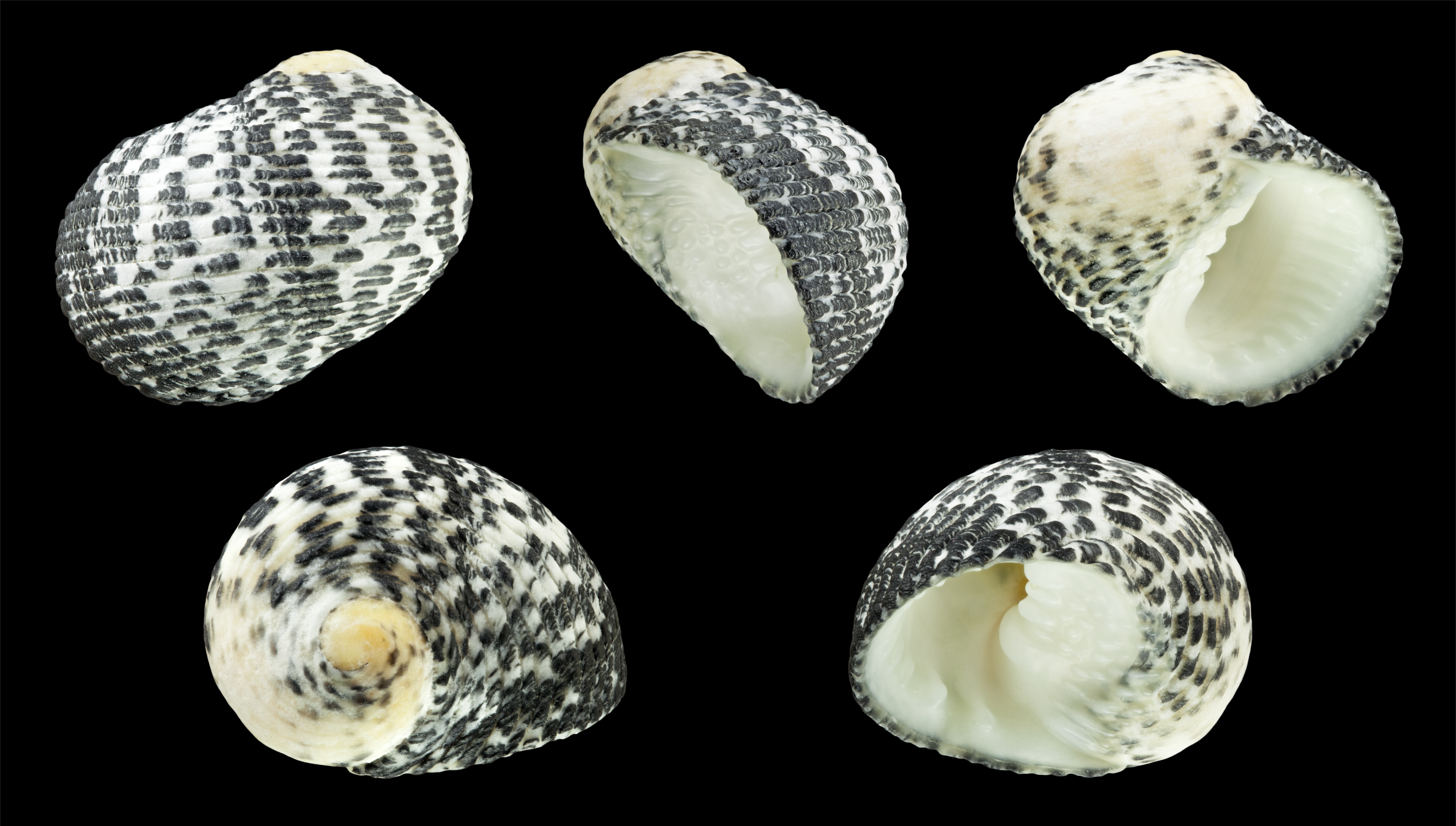

Scientific classification
- Kingdom: Animalia
- Phylum: Mollusca
- Class: Gastropoda
- Order: Cycloneritida
- Family: Neritidae
- Genus: Nerita
- Species: N. fulgurans

Binomial name
- Nerita fulgurans Gmelin, 1791

Synonyms
- Nerita antillarum Gmelin, 1791; Nerita nigreola Röding, 1798; Nerita praecognita C. B. Adams, 1845; Nerita albipunctata Reeve, 1855; Nerita lindae Petuch, 1988

= Nerita fulgurans =

Species of gastropod

Nerita fulgurans is a species of sea snail, a marine gastropod mollusk in the family Neritidae.

== Distribution ==
Usually found on hard structures in estuarine conditions protected from significant wave action. Found along the Atlantic coast of Florida, as far North as the St. Augustine inlet, to the south it has been identified on the island Barbados.

== Description ==
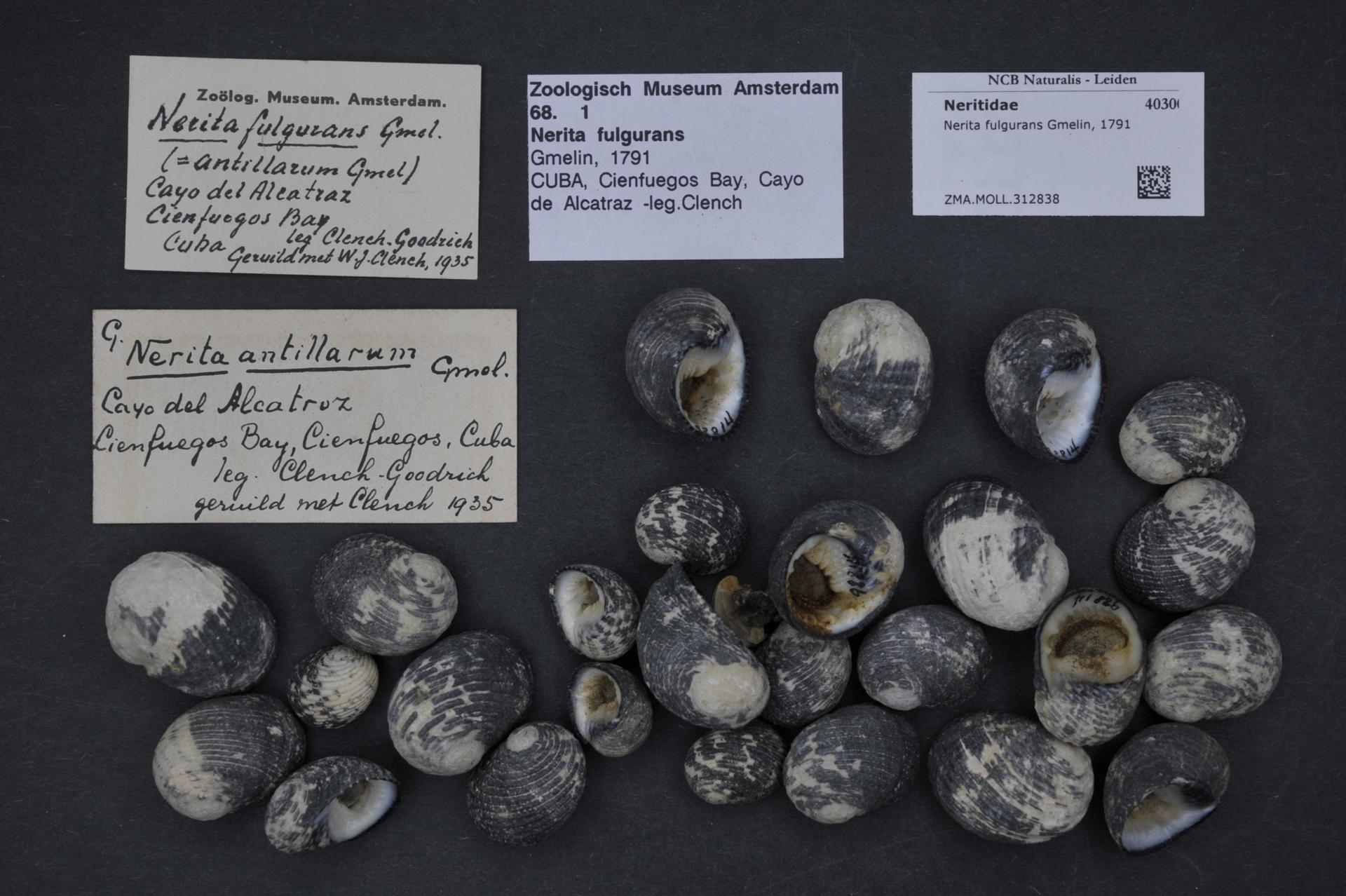
Nerita fulgurans shells

Nerita fulgurans is dark in colour with various shades of yellow and black on the shell. The maximum recorded shell length is 37 mm.

Circulatory system: The osmotic pressure of the hemolymph of Nerita fulgurans is 1060 mOsm.

== Habitat ==
Minimum recorded depth is 0 m. Maximum recorded depth is 0 m. The snail occupies the high rocky intertodal zone and prefers brackish habitats such as mangrove forests and seagrass beds.
