= Malakozoologische Blätter =

- Discipline: Malacology
- Language: German

Publication details
- History: 1854–1891; preceded by Zeitschrift für Malakozoologie (1844–1853)
- Publisher: T. Fischer (1854–1891) (Germany)

Standard abbreviations
- ISO 4: Malakozool. Bl.

Indexing
- LCCN: 09033230
- OCLC no.: 1756544

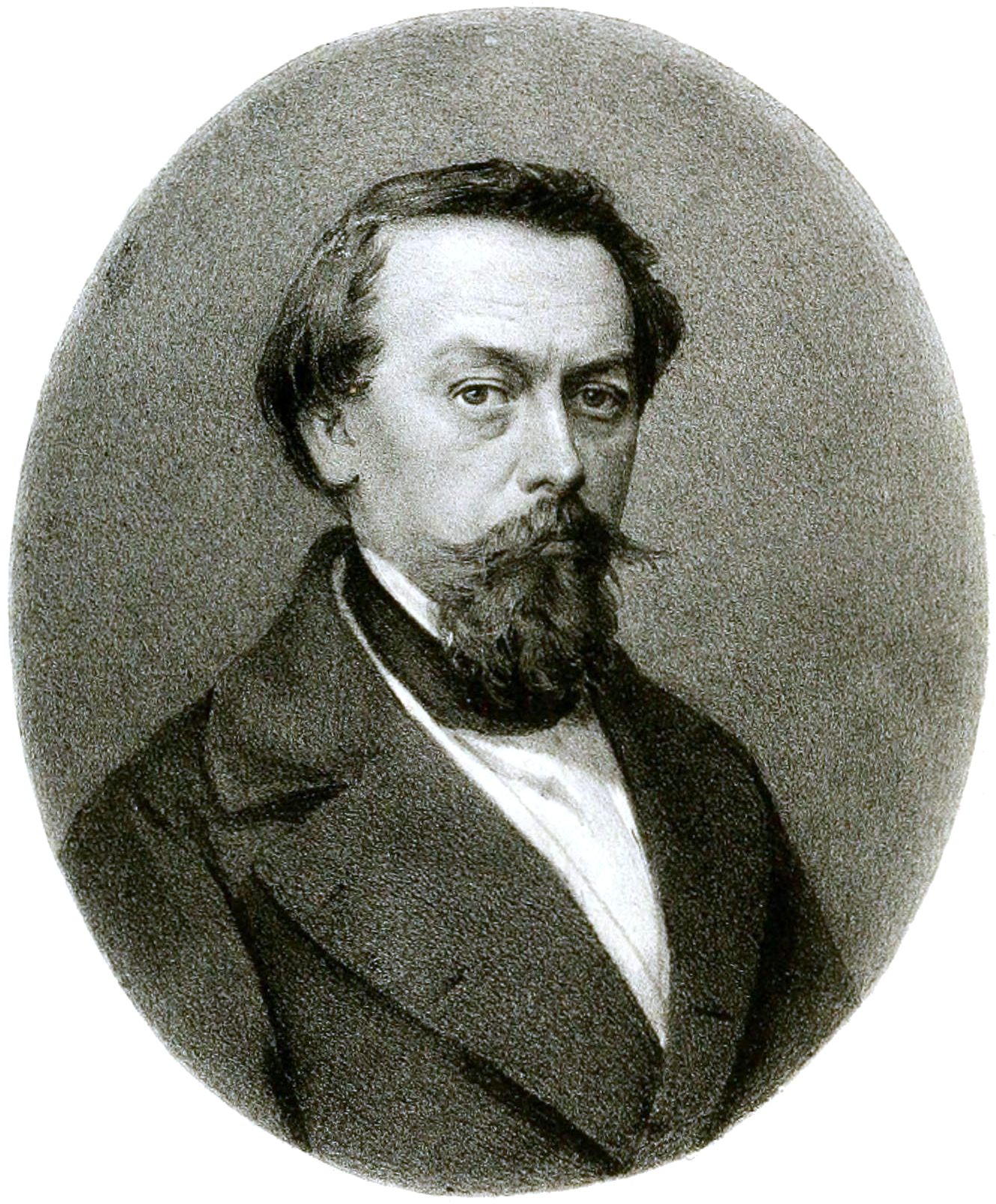
Portrait of Ludwig Karl Georg Pfeiffer in 1856

Malakozoologische Blätter was a German-language journal for malacology. It was published from 1854 to 1891 as a continuation of Zeitschrift für Malakozoologie (which was published 1844–1853). Karl Theodor Menke and Ludwig Karl Georg Pfeiffer were joint co-editors-in-chief, until Menke's death in 1861 after which Pfeiffer became sole editor-in-chief. Upon Pfeiffers's death in 1877, Stefan Clessin became sole editor-in-chief and continued in that capacity until cessation of publication with the last volume in 1891. The volumes from 1854 through 1878 were numbered from 1 to 25. The volumes from 1879 through 1891 were numbered in a new series (Neue Folge) from 1 through 11 with volumes 3 and 4 both for the year 1881 (so that volume 1 was in 1879 and volume 5 was in 1882). The journal was published by T. Fischer in Cassel.

According to the editors, the Malakozoologische Blätter was intended to allow for a broader scope of submissions and more frequent illustrations ...

In 1969, Otto Koeltz Antiquariat (Koenigstein-Taunus) published the Zeitschrift für Malakozoologie and the Malakozoologische Blätter in their entirety.
