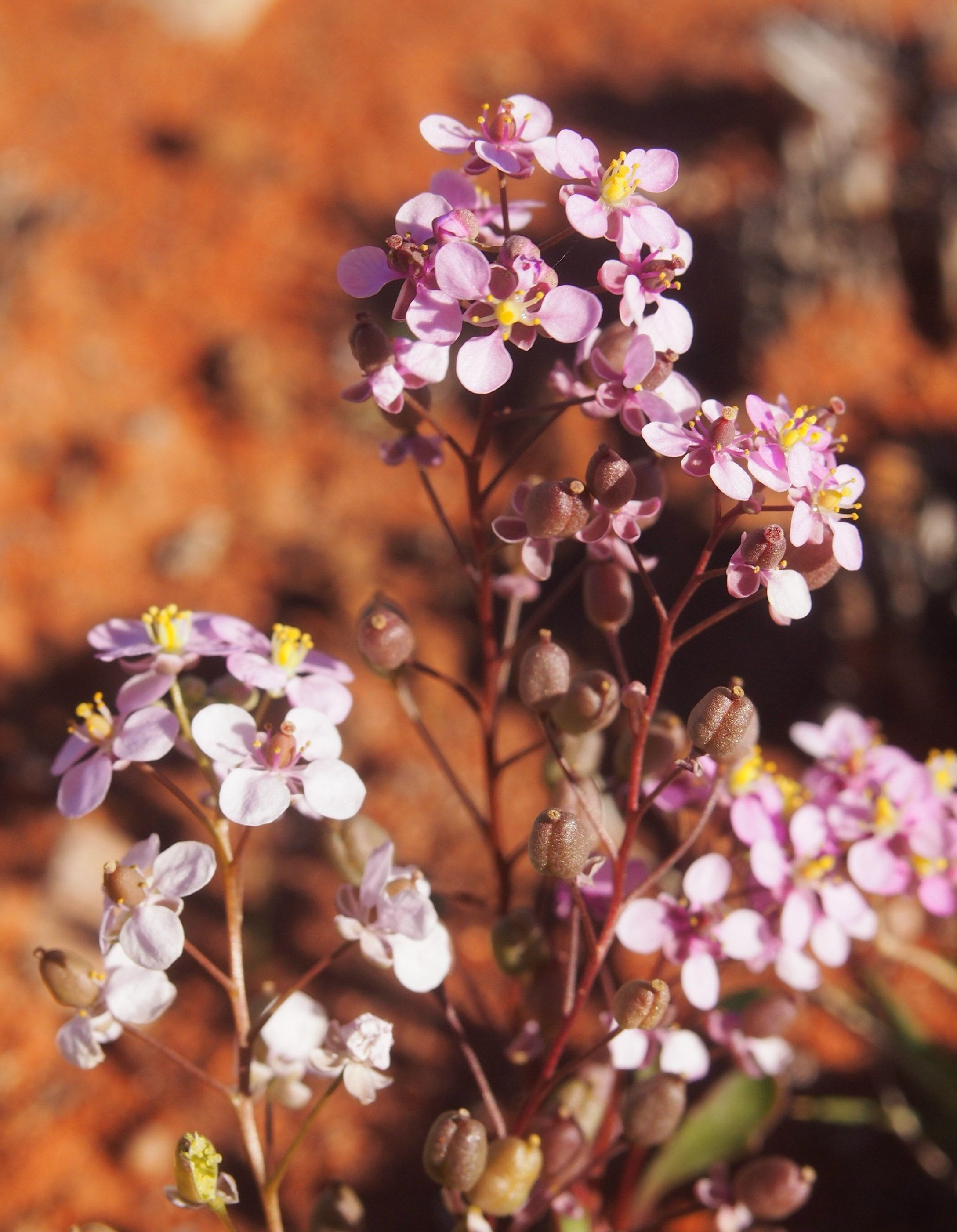
- Menkea sphaerocarpa

Scientific classification
- Kingdom: Plantae
- Clade: Tracheophytes
- Clade: Angiosperms
- Clade: Eudicots
- Clade: Rosids
- Order: Brassicales
- Family: Brassicaceae
- Genus: Menkea; Lehm.

= Menkea =

Genus of flowering plant

Menkea is a genus of flowering plants belonging to the family Brassicaceae. Species of the genus are native to Australia.

== Taxonomy ==
The genus name of Menkea is in honour of Karl Theodor Menke (1791–1861), a German malacologist and balneologist who was a native of Bremen. He is remembered for his research on snails. It was first described in 1843.

== Known species ==
According to Kew:

- Menkea australis Lehm.
- Menkea crassa E.A.Shaw
- Menkea draboides (Hook.) Benth.
- Menkea lutea E.A.Shaw
- Menkea sphaerocarpa F.Muell.
- Menkea villosula (F.Muell. & Tate) J.M.Black
