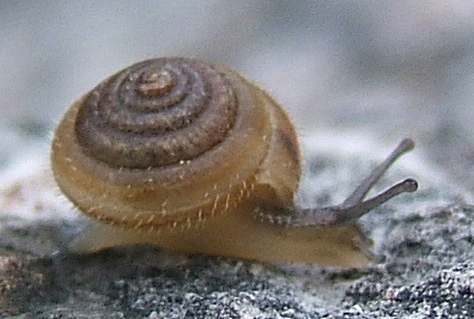

Scientific classification
- Kingdom: Animalia
- Phylum: Mollusca
- Class: Gastropoda
- Order: Stylommatophora
- Family: Hygromiidae
- Genus: Petasina
- Species: P. edentula

Binomial name
- Petasina edentula (Draparnaud, 1805)

Synonyms
- Helix edentula Draparnaud, 1805

= Petasina edentula =

Species of gastropod

Petasina edentula is a species of air-breathing land snail, a terrestrial pulmonate gastropod mollusk in the family Hygromiidae, the hairy snails and their allies.
