= Zeitschrift für Malakozoologie =

- Discipline: malacology
- Language: German

Publication details
- History: 1844–1853; continued as Malakozoologische Blätter (1854–1891)
- Publisher: Hahn'sche Hofbuchhandlung (1844–1845); T. Fischer (1846–1853) (Germany)
- Frequency: monthly

Standard abbreviations
- ISO 4: Z. Malakozool.

Indexing
- LCCN: 10019040
- OCLC no.: 1640285

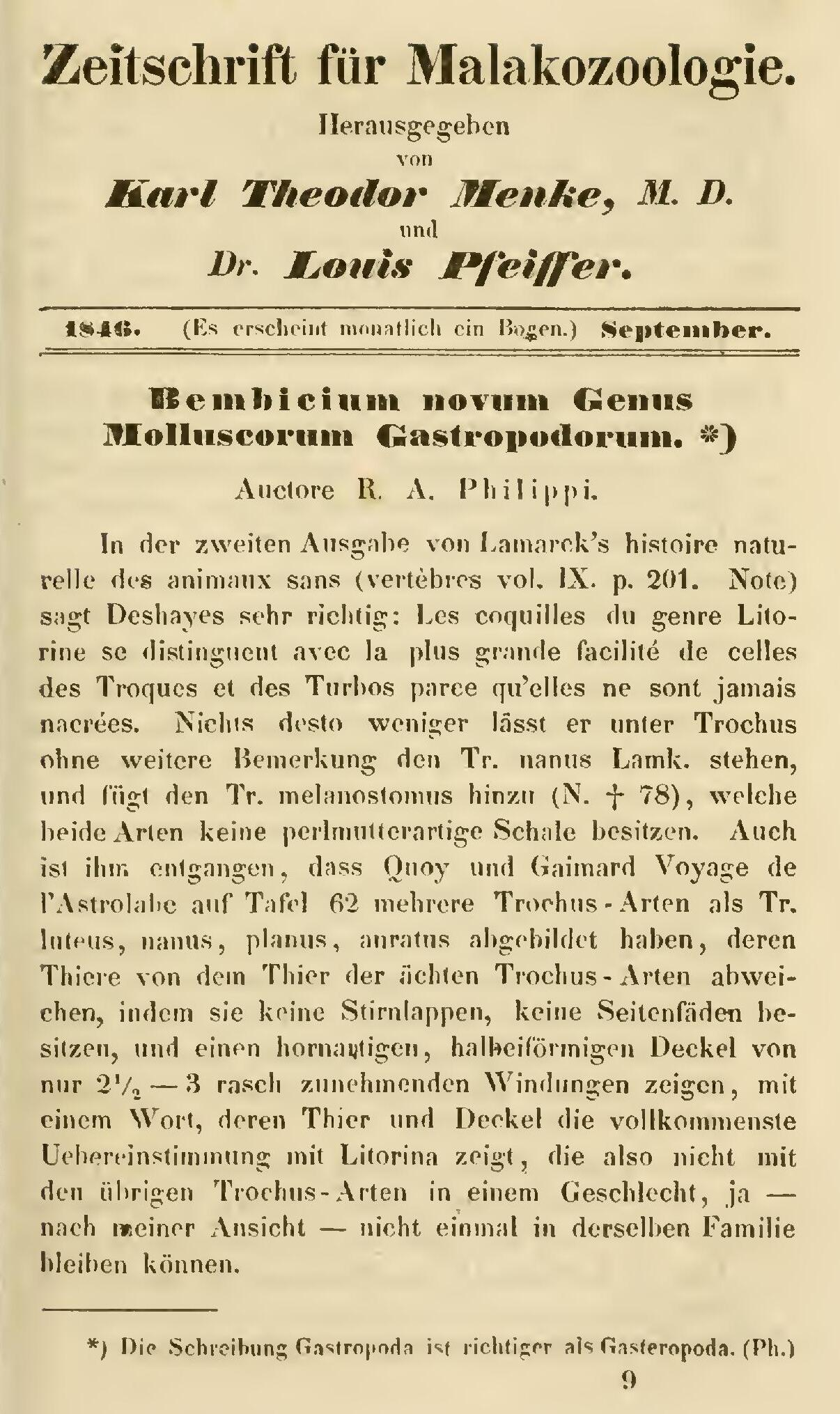
Title page of the journal Zeitschrift für Malakozoologie (vol. 3, 1846, September issue); first page of an article by R. A. Philippi.

Zeitschrift für Malakozoologie was a German-language journal for malacology. It was founded by Karl Theodor Menke in 1844. Starting in 1846, Ludwig Karl Georg Pfeiffer and Menke were co-editors-in-chief of the Zeitschrift. There were 10 published volumes. The Zeitschrift was published in 1844–1845 by Hahn'sche Hofbuchhandlung in Hannover and then in 1846–1853 by T. Fischer in Cassel. Publication was continued in 1854 under the title Malakozoologische Blätter until cessation with the last volume in 1891.

Germany is home to the earliest malacological journal—several short-lived serials authored and published by J. S. Schröter from 1770 to 1789 ... However, the first German malacological journal in a modern sense—with editors and contributions from multiple authors—was the Zeitschrift für Malakozoologie, founded in 1844 by Karl Theodor Menke (1791–1961) ... During its ten years, the journal published the descriptions of somewhere around 1,000 new species, of which at least half were described by Philippi alone.
