= Heinrich August Ludwig Wiggers =

German pharmacist, chemist and botanist (1803–1880)

- Born: 12 June 1803; Altenhagen
- Died: 13 February 1880 (aged 76); Göttingen
- Scientific career
- Fields: Botany, Chemistry
- Author abbrev. (botany): A.Wigg.

Heinrich August Ludwig Wiggers (12 June 1803 – 13 February 1880) was a German pharmacist, chemist and botanist born in Altenhagen (today part of the city of Springe).

Trained as a pharmacist, in 1827 he relocated to the University of Göttingen, where he served as a laboratory assistant under chemist Friedrich Stromeyer (1776–1835), and later as an assistant to Friedrich Wöhler (1800–1882) until 1849.

In the meantime he earned his doctorate in 1835, later becoming a private lecturer (1837) and an associate professor of pharmacy (1848) at the university. From 1836 to 1850 he served as deputy inspector-general, later associate inspector-general, of all pharmacies in the Kingdom of Hanover (after 1860 this included the Principality of Lippe).

== Selected writings ==
- Inquisitio in Secale cornutum, Respectu inprimis habito ad ejus Ortum, Naturam et Partes constituentes nominatim eas, quibus Vires medicinales adscribendae sunt . Rosenbach, Gottingae [u.a.] 1831 Digital edition by the University and State Library Düsseldorf
- Die Trennung und Prüfung metallischer Gifte aus verdächtigen organischen Substanzen : mit Rücksicht auf Blausäure und Opium, 1835
- Grundriss der Pharmacognosie, 1840 Digital edition / Digital 2nd edition from 1847 by the University and State Library Düsseldorf
- Handbuch der Pharmacognosie, 1864. Digital edition by the University and State Library Düsseldorf
