= Johann Gottfried Leonhardi =

German physician and chemist (1746–1823)

Johann Gottfried Leonhardi (18 June 1746, Leipzig – 11 January 1823, Dresden) was a German medical doctor and chemist.

In 1771 he received his medical doctorate from the University of Leipzig, where in 1781, he became an associate professor. In 1782 he relocated to the University of Wittenberg as a professor of anatomy and botany, and shortly afterwards, was appointed professor of pathology and surgery. In 1789 he became a member of the Academy of Sciences Leopoldina.

From 1791 to 1823 he served as physician to royalty in Dresden, and in the meantime, retained his professorship at Wittenberg — while absent at the university, substitutes were chosen to perform his academic duties.

== Published works ==
He is best remembered for his translation and edition of Pierre-Joseph Macquer's "Dictionnaire de chimie", with the title of "Chymisches Wörterbuch oder Allgemeine Begriffe der Chymie nach alphabetischer Ordnung" (Chemical dictionary or common terms of chemistry by alphabetical order; 6 volumes, 1781–83). He published another edition in 1788–91, and later on, a third German edition was issued by Jeremias Benjamin Richter and Sigismund Friedrich Hermbstädt (1806–09). His other noted written efforts include:

- Aerologiae physico-chemicae recentioris primae lineae, 1781.
- Chemische Abhandlung von Luft und Feuer, 1782 – Chemical treatise on air and fire (with Carl Wilhelm Scheele, Torbern Bergman).
- Animadversiones chemico therapeuticae de ferro, 1785.
- Pharmacopoea saxonica, 1820.
