= Pinus abies =

Pinus abies is a taxonomic synonym that may refer to:

- Pinus abies L. = Picea abies
- Pinus abies Du Roi, nom. illeg. = Abies alba
- Pinus abies var. laxa Münchh. = Picea glauca
