= Karl Theodor Menke =

German malacologist and balneologist (1791–1861)

- Born: 13 September 1791; Bremen, Germany
- Died: 1861 (aged 69–70); Bad Pyrmont, Germany
- Education: University of Göttingen
- Scientific career
- Fields: Malacology; Balneology

Karl Theodor Menke (13 September 1791 – 1861) was a German malacologist and balneologist who was a native of Bremen. He is remembered for his research on snails.

Menke studied medicine at the University of Göttingen (with Promotion in 1814), and worked as a physician at the spa in Bad Pyrmont. In 1831, he was elected a member of the Academy of Sciences Leopoldina. In 1844, he founded the journal Zeitschrift für Malakozoologie (from 1854 titled Malakozoologische Blätter). With Ludwig Karl Georg Pfeiffer (1805—1877), he was editor of the magazine.

During his lifetime, Menke amassed a large collection of snail shells, which were purchased by dealer M. J. Landauer of Frankfurt after his death.

The sea snail species Cerithium menkei and Natica menkeana are named in honor of Menke. In 1843, Menkea a genus of flowering plants from Australia, belonging to the family Brassicaceae was published and named in his honour.

== Bibliography ==
- Karl Theodor Menke (1814) Dissertatio inauguralis botanico-Philologico-Medica de Leguminibus Veterum: Part. Prima, quam illustris medicorum ordinis consensu et auctoritate in Academia Georgia Augusta, quum summos artis medicar et chirurgicae honores assepisset – Dieterich.
- Karl Theodor Menke (1814) De leguminibus veterum – Dietrich.
- Lu Jurine, Ludwig Jurine, Louis Jurine, Karl Theodor Menke & Friedrich Ludwig Kreysig (1816) Abhandlung über die Brustbräune – Hahn.
- Karl Theodor Menke (1818) Pÿrmont und seine Umgebungen, mit besonderer Hinsicht auf seine Mineralquellen ... Mit einer topographisch-petrographischen Charte – Uslar.
- Karl Theodor Menke (1824 or 1825) Lage, Ursprung, Namen, Beschreibung, Alterthum, Mythus und Geschichte der Extersteine.
- Karl Theodor Menke (1825) Versuch einer näheren Geologischen, Geognostischen und oryktognostischen Erörterung des Fürstenthums Pyrmont – Hermannsche Schriften.
- Karl Theodor Menke (1828) Synopsis methodica Molluscorum generum omnium et specierum earum ....
- Karl Theodor Menke (1829) Verzeichniss der ansehnlichen Conchylien-sammlung des Freiherrn von der Malsburg... – H. Gelpke.
- Karl Theodor Menke (1830) Synopsis methodica molluscorum generum omnium et specierum earum, quae in Museo Menkeano adservantur: cum synonymia critica et novarum specierum diagnosibus. – G. Uslar.
- Karl Theodor Menke (1835) Die Heilkräfte des Pyrmonter Stahlwassers... – Georg Uslar.
- Karl Theodor Menke (1840) Pyrmont und seine Umgebungen: mit besonderer Hinsicht auf seine Mineralquellen – Weinholt. Digital edition by the University and State Library Düsseldorf
- Karl Theodor Menke & Johann Georg Christian Lehmann (1843) Molluscorum Novae Hollandiae specimen. – Libraria Aulica Hahniana, Hanover.
- Karl Theodor Menke (1843) Lydiaca. Dissertatio ethnographica.
- Karl Theodor Menke (1854) Drei Anforderungen an die Gesellschaft deutscher Naturforscher und Aerzte und deren Begründung.
- Heinrich August Ludwig Wiggers & Carl Theodor Menke (1857) Chemische Untersuchung der Pyrmonter Eisensäuerlinge.
- Karl Theodor Menke (1857) Antiquissimorum Quorundam Scriptorum, qui vim AC Salubritatem Aquarum Pyrmontanarum Illustrarunt Recensum Exhib. Car. Theod. Menke.
- Karl Theodor Menke (1981) Lage, Ursprung, Namen, Beschreibung, Altertum, Mythus und Geschichte der Extersteine – Verlag der Manufactur. ISBN 3-88080-007-3.
