= Synonym (taxonomy) =

Scientific name that also applies to a taxon

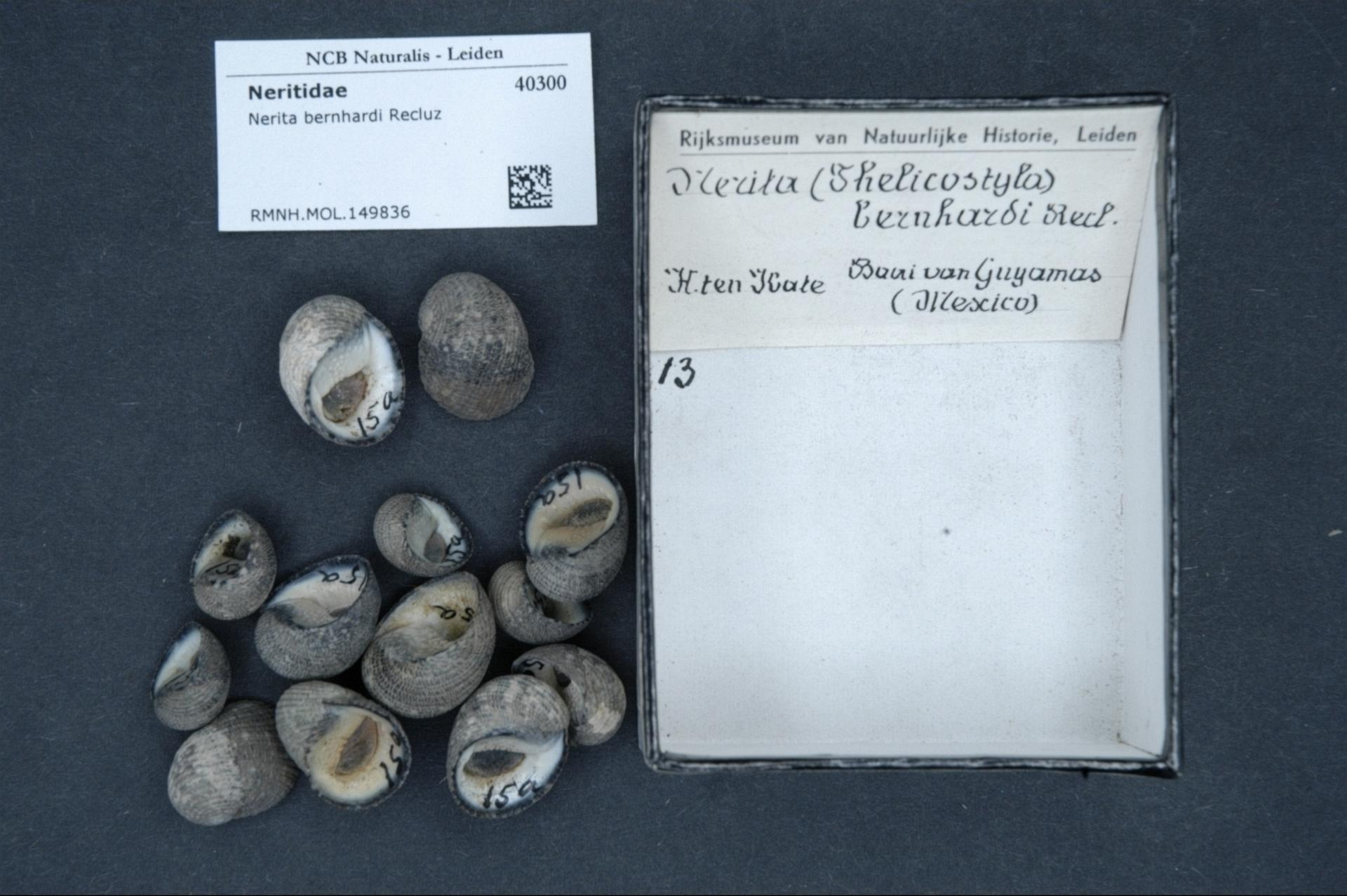
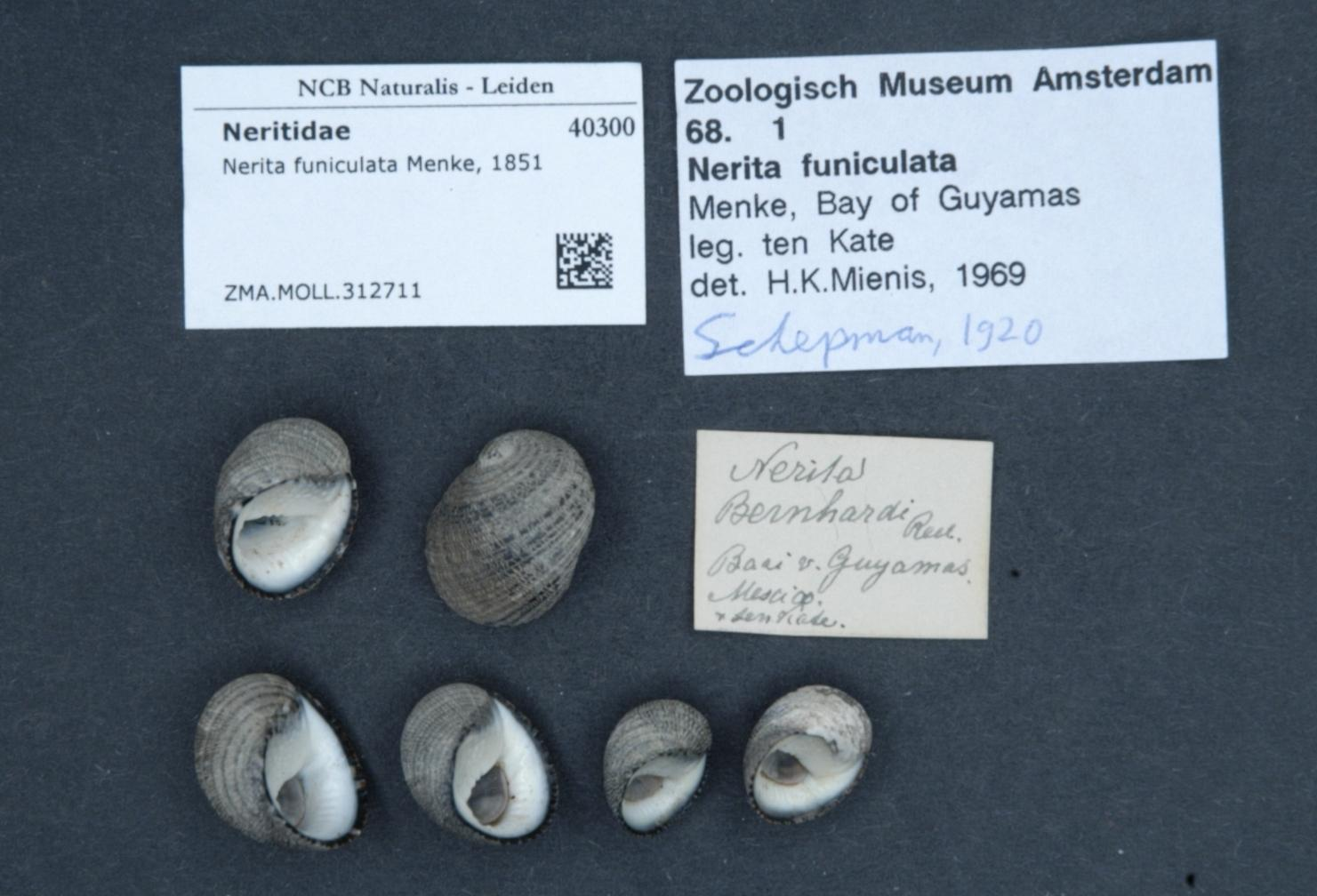
Nerita bernhardi (left), described by Lovell Augustus Reeve in 1855, was later determined to be a junior subjective synonym to Nerita funiculata (right), which had been described five years earlier by Karl Theodor Menke.

In biological taxonomy, a synonym is one of two or more scientific names that apply to the same taxon. The botanical and zoological codes of nomenclature treat the concept of synonymy differently.

In botanical nomenclature, a synonym is a scientific name that applies to a taxon that now goes by a different scientific name. For example, Linnaeus was the first to give a scientific name (under the currently used system of scientific nomenclature) to the Norway spruce, which he called Pinus abies. This name is no longer in use, so it is now a synonym of the current scientific name, Picea abies.

In zoology, moving a species from one genus to another results in a different binomen, but the name is considered an alternative combination rather than a synonym. The concept of synonymy in zoology is reserved for two names at the same rank that refers to a taxon at that rank – for example, the name Papilio prorsa Linnaeus, 1758 is a junior synonym of Papilio levana Linnaeus, 1758, being names for different seasonal forms of the species now referred to as Araschnia levana (Linnaeus, 1758), the map butterfly. However, Araschnia levana is not a synonym of Papilio levana in the taxonomic sense employed by the International Code of Zoological Nomenclature.

Unlike synonyms in other contexts, in taxonomy a synonym is not interchangeable with the name of which it is a synonym. In taxonomy, synonyms are not equals, but have a different status. For any taxon with a particular circumscription, position, and rank, only one scientific name is considered to be the correct one at any given time (this correct name is to be determined by applying the relevant code of nomenclature). A synonym cannot exist in isolation: it is always an alternative to a different scientific name. Given that the correct name of a taxon depends on the taxonomic viewpoint used (resulting in a particular circumscription, position and rank) a name that is one taxonomist's synonym may be another taxonomist's correct name (and vice versa).

Synonyms may arise whenever the same taxon is described and named independently more than once. They may also arise when existing taxa are changed, as when two taxa are joined to become one, a species is moved to a different genus, a variety is moved to a different species, etc. Synonyms also come about when the codes of nomenclature change, so that older names are no longer acceptable; for example, Erica herbacea L. has been rejected in favour of the conserved name of Erica carnea L. and is thus its synonym.

== General usage ==
To the general user of scientific names, in fields such as agriculture, horticulture, ecology, general science, etc., a synonym is a name that was previously used as the correct scientific name (in handbooks and similar sources) but which has been displaced by another scientific name, which is now regarded as correct. Thus Oxford Dictionaries Online defines the term as "a taxonomic name which has the same application as another, especially one which has been superseded and is no longer valid". In handbooks and general texts, it is useful to have synonyms mentioned as such after the current scientific name, so as to avoid confusion. For example, if the much-advertised name change should go through and the scientific name of the fruit fly were changed to Sophophora melanogaster, it would be very helpful if any mention of this name was accompanied by "(syn. Drosophila melanogaster)". Synonyms used in this way may not always meet the strict definitions of the term "synonym" in the formal rules of nomenclature which govern scientific names (see below).

Changes of scientific name have two causes: they may be taxonomic or nomenclatural. A name change may be caused by changes in the circumscription, position or rank of a taxon, representing a change in taxonomic, scientific insight (as would be the case for the fruit fly, mentioned above). A name change may be due to purely nomenclatural reasons, that is, based on the rules of nomenclature; as for example when an older name is (re)discovered which has priority over the current name. In general, name changes for nomenclatural reasons have become less frequent over time as the rules of nomenclature allow for the current name to be conserved (i.e. kept, even though contrary to other rules), so as to promote stability of scientific names.

== Zoology ==
In zoological nomenclature, codified in the International Code of Zoological Nomenclature, synonyms are different scientific names of the same taxonomic rank that pertain to the same taxon. For example, a particular species could, over time, have had two or more species-rank names published for it, while the same is applicable at higher ranks such as genera, families, orders, etc. In each case, the earliest published name is called the senior synonym, while the later name is the junior synonym. In the case where two names for the same taxon have been published simultaneously, the valid name is selected according to the principle of the first reviser such that, for example, of the names Strix scandiaca and Strix noctua (Aves), both published by Linnaeus in the same work at the same date for the taxon now determined to be the snowy owl, the epithet scandiaca has been selected as the valid name, with noctua becoming the junior synonym (incidentally, this species has since been reclassified and currently resides in the genus Bubo, as Bubo scandiacus).

One basic principle of zoological nomenclature is that the earliest correctly published (and thus available) name, the senior synonym, by default takes precedence in naming rights, and therefore, unless other restrictions interfere, must be used for the taxon. However, junior synonyms are still important to document, because if the earliest name cannot be used (for example, because the same spelling had previously been used for a name established for another taxon), then the next available junior synonym must be used for the taxon. For other purposes, if a researcher is interested in consulting or compiling all currently known information regarding a taxon, some of this (including species descriptions, distribution, ecology and more) may well have been published under names now regarded as outdated (i.e., synonyms) and so it is again useful to know a list of historical synonyms that have been used for a given current (valid) taxon name.

Objective synonyms refer to taxa with the same type and same rank (more or less the same taxon, although circumscription may vary, even widely). This may be species-group taxa of the same rank with the same type specimen, genus-group taxa of the same rank with the same type species or if their type species are themselves objective synonyms, of family-group taxa with the same type genus, etc.

In the case of subjective synonyms, there is no such shared type, so the synonymy is open to taxonomic judgement, meaning that there is room for debate: one researcher might consider the two (or more) types to refer to one and the same taxon, another might consider them to belong to different taxa. For example, John Edward Gray published the name Antilocapra anteflexa in 1855 for a species of pronghorn, based on a pair of horns. However, it is now commonly accepted that his specimen was an unusual individual of the species Antilocapra americana published by George Ord in 1815. Ord's name thus takes precedence, with Antilocapra anteflexa being a junior subjective synonym.

Objective synonyms are common at the rank of genera, because for various reasons two genera may contain the same type species; these are objective synonyms. In many cases researchers established new generic names because they thought this was necessary or did not know that others had previously established another genus for the same group of species. An example is the genus Pomatia Beck, 1837, which was established for a group of terrestrial snails containing as its type species the Burgundy or Roman snail Helix pomatia—since Helix pomatia was already the type species for the genus Helix Linnaeus, 1758, the genus Pomatia was an objective synonym (and useless). On the same occasion, Helix is also a synonym of Pomatia, but it is older and so it has precedence.

At the species level, subjective synonyms are common because of an unexpectedly large range of variation in a species, or simple ignorance about an earlier description, may lead a biologist to describe a newly discovered specimen as a new species. A common reason for objective synonyms at this level is the creation of a replacement name.

A junior synonym can be given precedence over a senior synonym, primarily when the senior name has not been used since 1899, and the junior name is in common use. The older name may be declared to be a nomen oblitum, and the junior name declared a nomen protectum. This rule exists primarily to prevent the confusion that would result if a well-known name, with a large accompanying body of literature, were to be replaced by a completely unfamiliar name. An example is the European land snail Petasina edentula (Draparnaud, 1805). In 2002, researchers found that an older name Helix depilata Draparnaud, 1801 referred to the same species, but this name had never been used after 1899 and was fixed as a nomen oblitum under this rule by Falkner et al. 2002.

Such a reversal of precedence is also possible if the senior synonym was established after 1900, but only if the International Commission on Zoological Nomenclature (ICZN) approves an application. (Here the C in ICZN stands for Commission, not Code as it does at the beginning of § Zoology. The two are related, with only one word difference between their names.) For example, the scientific name of the red imported fire ant, Solenopsis invicta, was published by Buren in 1972, who did not know that this species was first named Solenopsis saevissima wagneri by Santschi in 1916; as there were thousands of publications using the name invicta before anyone discovered the synonymy, the ICZN, in 2001, ruled that invicta would be given precedence over wagneri.

To qualify as a synonym in zoology, a name must be properly published in accordance with the rules. Manuscript names and names that were mentioned without any description (nomina nuda) are not considered as synonyms in zoological nomenclature.

== Botany ==
In botanical nomenclature, a synonym is a name that is not correct for the circumscription, position, and rank of the taxon as considered in the particular botanical publication. It is always "a synonym of the correct scientific name", but which name is correct depends on the taxonomic opinion of the author. In botany the various kinds of synonyms are:

- Homotypic, or nomenclatural, synonyms (sometimes indicated by ≡) have the same type (specimen) and the same taxonomic rank. The Linnaean name Pinus abies L. has the same type as Picea abies (L.) H.Karst. When Picea is taken to be the correct genus for this species (there is almost complete consensus on that), Pinus abies is a homotypic synonym of Picea abies. However, if the species were considered to belong to Pinus (now unlikely) the relationship would be reversed and Picea abies would become a homotypic synonym of Pinus abies. A homotypic synonym need not share an epithet or name with the correct name; what matters is that it shares the type. For example, the name Taraxacum officinale for a species of dandelion has the same type as Leontodon taraxacum L. The latter is a homotypic synonym of Taraxacum officinale F.H.Wigg.
- Heterotypic, or taxonomic, synonyms (sometimes indicated by =) have different types. Some botanists split the common dandelion into many, quite restricted species. The name of each such species has its own type. When the common dandelion is regarded as including all those small species, the names of all those species are heterotypic synonyms of Taraxacum officinale F.H.Wigg. Reducing a taxon to a heterotypic synonym is termed "to sink in synonymy" or "as synonym".

In botany, although a synonym must be a formally accepted scientific name (a validly published name): a listing of "synonyms", a "synonymy", often contains designations that for some reason did not make it as a formal name, such as manuscript names, or even misidentifications (although it is now the usual practice to list misidentifications separately).

== Comparison between zoology and botany ==
Although the basic principles are fairly similar, the treatment of synonyms in botanical nomenclature differs in detail and terminology from zoological nomenclature, where the correct name is included among synonyms, although as first among equals it is the "senior synonym":

- Synonyms in botany are equivalent to "junior synonyms" in zoology.
- The homotypic or nomenclatural synonyms in botany are equivalent to "objective synonyms" in zoology.
- The heterotypic or taxonomic synonyms in botany are equivalent to "subjective synonyms" in zoology.
- If the name of a species changes solely on account of its allocation to a new genus ("new combination"), in botany this is regarded as creating a synonym in the case of the original or previous combination, but not in zoology (where the fundamental nomenclatural unit is regarded as the species epithet, not the binomen, and this has generally not changed). Nevertheless, in popular usage, previous or alternative/non-current combinations are frequently listed as synonyms in zoology as well as in botany.

== Practical applications ==
Scientific papers may include lists of taxa, synonymizing existing taxa and (in some cases) listing references to them.

The status of a synonym may be indicated by symbols, as for instance in a system proposed for use in paleontology by Rudolf Richter. In that system a v before the year would indicate that the authors have inspected the original material; a . that they take on the responsibility for the act of synonymizing the taxa.

The accurate use of scientific names, including synonyms, is crucial in biomedical and pharmacological research involving plants. Failure to use correct botanical nomenclature can lead to ambiguity, hinder reproducibility of results, and potentially cause errors in medicine. Best practices for publication suggest that researchers should provide the currently accepted binomial with author citation, relevant synonyms, and the accepted family name according to the Angiosperm Phylogeny Group III classification. This practice ensures clear communication, allows proper linking of research to existing literature, and provides insight into phylogenetic relationships that may be relevant to shared chemical constituents or physiological effects. Online databases now make it easy for researchers to access correct nomenclature and synonymy information for plant species.

== Other usage ==
The traditional concept of synonymy is often expanded in taxonomic literature to include pro parte (or "for part") synonyms. These are caused by splits and circumscriptional changes. They are usually indicated by the abbreviation "p.p." For example:

- When Dandy described Galium tricornutum, he cited G. tricorne Stokes (1787) pro parte as a synonym, but explicitly excluded the type (specimen) of G. tricorne from the new species G. tricornutum. Thus G. tricorne was subdivided.
- The Angiosperm Phylogeny Group's summary of plant classification states that family Verbenaceae "are much reduced compared to a decade or so ago, and many genera have been placed in Lamiaceae", but Avicennia, which was once included in Verbenaceae has been moved to Acanthaceae. Thus, it could be said that Verbenaceae pro parte is a synonym of Acanthaceae, and Verbenaceae pro parte is also a synonym of Lamiaceae. However, this terminology is rarely used because it is clearer to reserve the term "pro parte" for situations that divide a taxon that includes the type from one that does not.

== See also ==
- Chresonym
- Glossary of scientific naming
- Ornithocheirus – a case history
- Species inquirenda
- Superseded combination
