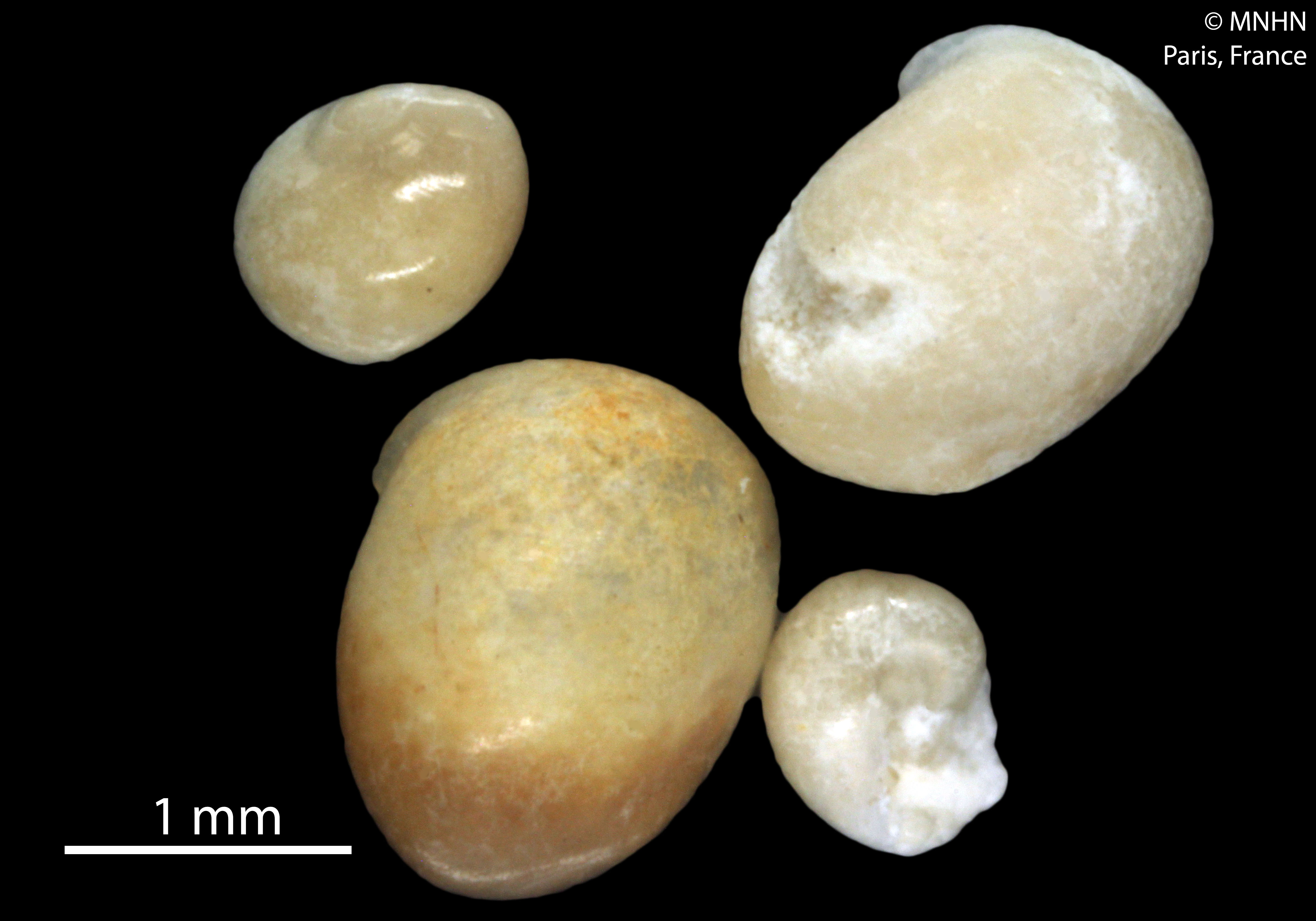
- Shell of Siaesella fragilis (paratype at MNHN, Paris)

Scientific classification
- Kingdom: Animalia
- Phylum: Mollusca
- Class: Gastropoda
- Order: Cycloneritida
- Family: Neritiliidae
- Genus: Siaesella
- Species: S. fragilis

Binomial name
- Siaesella fragilis Kano & Kase, 2008

= Siaesella fragilis =

Species of gastropod

Siaesella fragilis is a species of submarine cave snail, a marine gastropod mollusk in the family Neritiliidae.
