= Neritilia cavernicola =

Scientific classification
- Kingdom: Animalia
- Phylum: Mollusca
- Class: Gastropoda
- Order: Cycloneritida
- Family: Neritiliidae
- Genus: Neritilia
- Species: N. cavernicola

Binomial name
- Neritilia cavernicola Kano & Kase, 2004

Species of gastropod

Neritilia cavernicola is a species of submarine cave snail, a marine gastropod mollusc in the family Neritiliidae.
