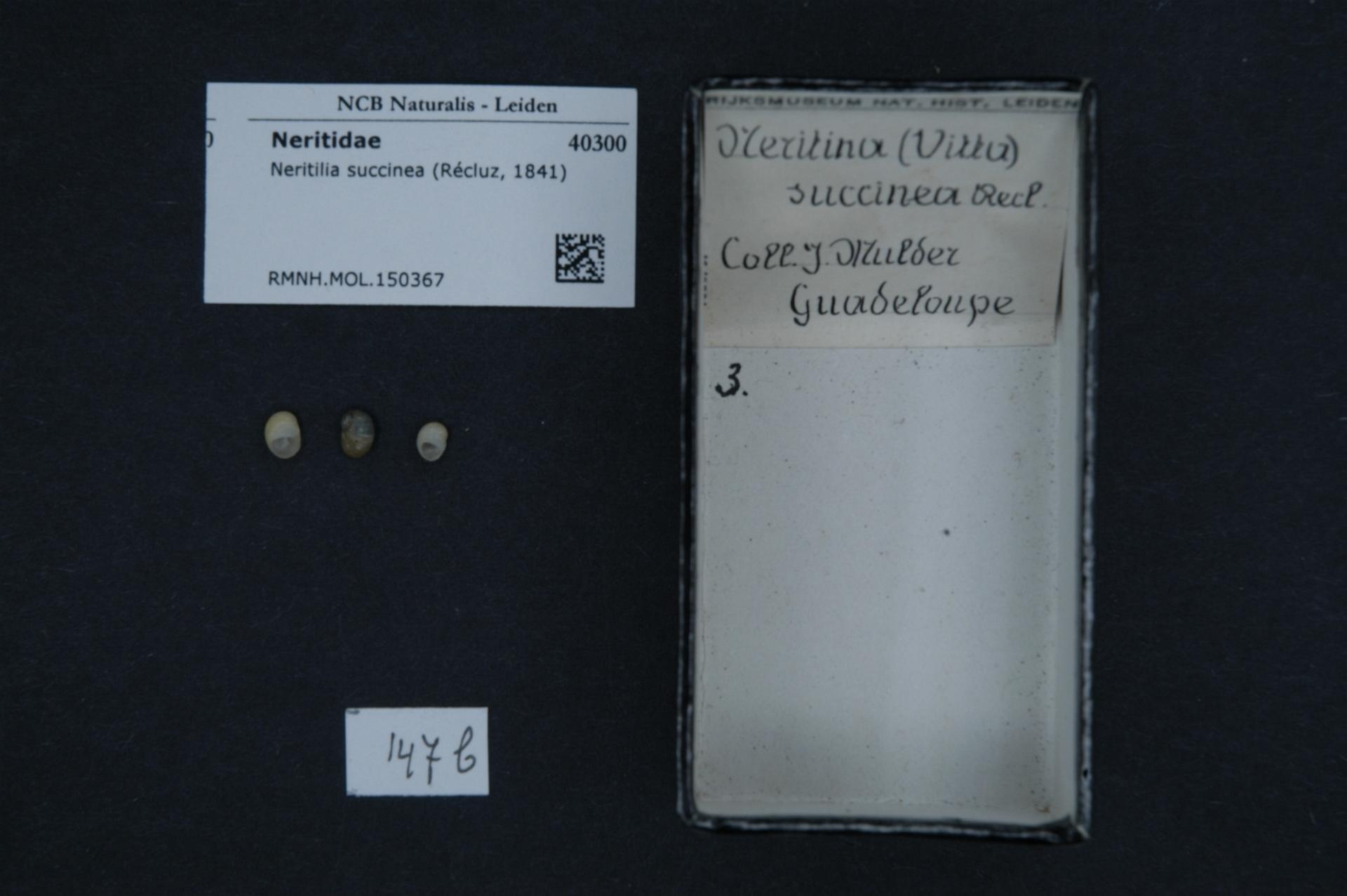
- Neritilia succinea shells

Scientific classification
- Kingdom: Animalia
- Phylum: Mollusca
- Class: Gastropoda
- Order: Cycloneritida
- Family: Neritiliidae
- Genus: Neritilia
- Species: N. succinea

Binomial name
- Neritilia succinea (Récluz, 1841)

Synonyms
- Nerita succinea Récluz, 1841 (original combination); Neritilia succinea guatemalensis Pilsbry, 1920; Neritina pygmaea C. B. Adams, 1845 (junior synonym)

= Neritilia succinea =

Species of gastropod

Neritilia succinea is a species of marine cave snail, a marine gastropod mollusc in the family Neritiliidae.

Subspecies Neritilia succinea guatemalensis Pilsbry, 1920: synonym of Neritilia succinea (Récluz, 1841)

== Description ==
The length of the shell attains 5 mm.

== Distribution ==
This species fas found on the riverbank on the West Indian island of Dominica.; also off Guadeloupe.
