= Pisulina maxima =

Scientific classification
- Kingdom: Animalia
- Phylum: Mollusca
- Class: Gastropoda
- Order: Cycloneritida
- Family: Neritiliidae
- Genus: Pisulina
- Species: P. maxima

Binomial name
- Pisulina maxima Kano & Kase, 2000

Species of gastropod

Pisulina maxima is a species of submarine cave snail, a marine gastropod mollusc in the family Neritiliidae.
