= Anchialine pool snail =

Conservation status
- Data Deficient (IUCN 2.3)

- Critically Imperiled (NatureServe)

Scientific classification
- Kingdom: Animalia
- Phylum: Mollusca
- Class: Gastropoda
- Order: Cycloneritida
- Family: Neritiliidae
- Genus: Neritilia
- Species: N. hawaiiensis

Binomial name
- Neritilia hawaiiensis Kay, 1979

Species of gastropod

The anchialine pool snail, scientific name Neritilia hawaiiensis, is a species living in brackish estuaries and in anchialine pools. These snails have an operculum, and are aquatic gastropod mollusk in the family Neritiliidae.

== Distribution ==
This species is endemic to the islands of Hawaii, United States, and lives only in brackish estuaries and in anchialine pools, which are marine pools that have no surface connection with the ocean but that are salty and that fluctuate in level with the tides.
