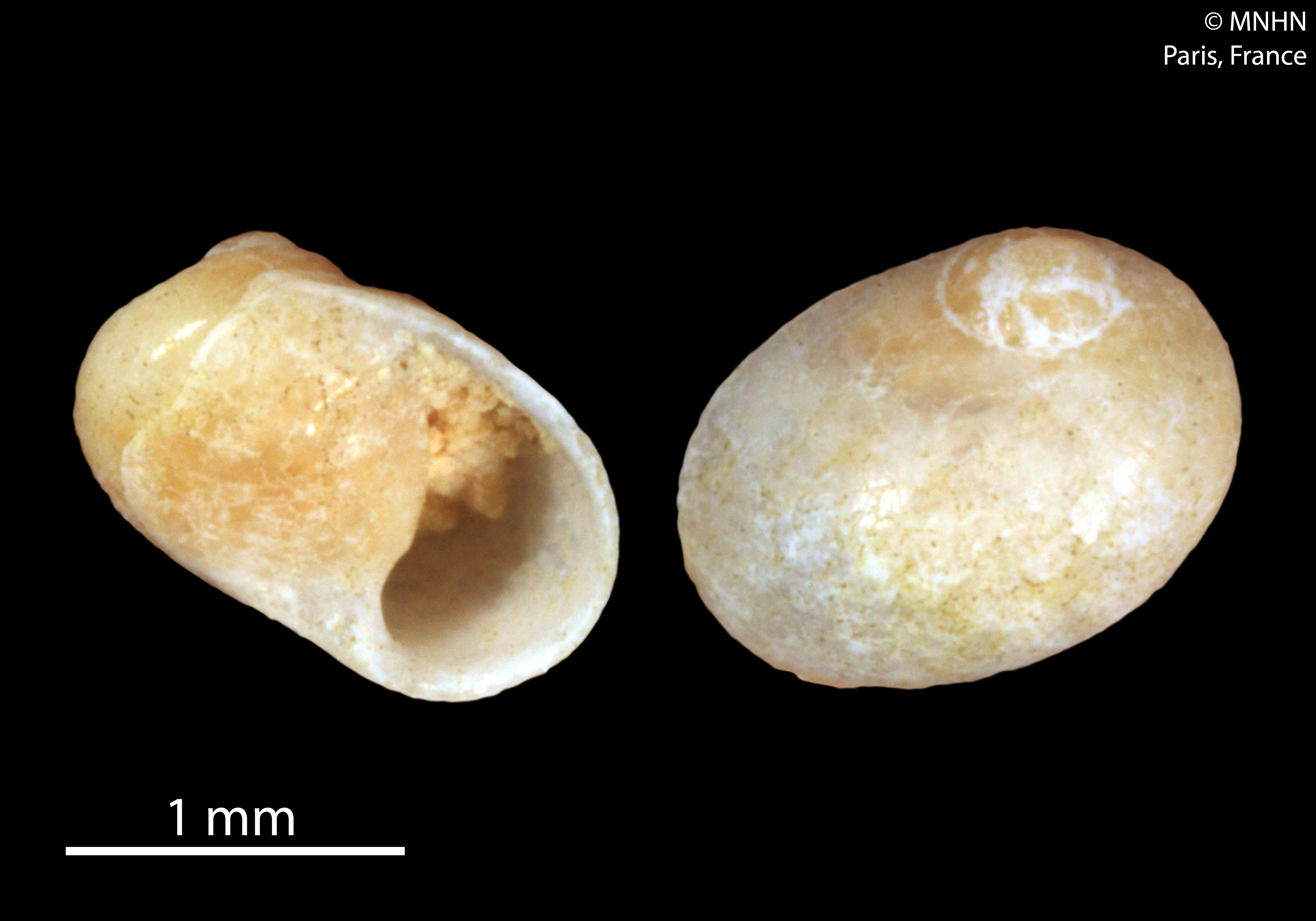

Scientific classification
- Kingdom: Animalia
- Phylum: Mollusca
- Class: Gastropoda
- Order: Cycloneritida
- Family: Neritiliidae
- Genus: Micronerita
- Species: M. pulchella

Binomial name
- Micronerita pulchella Kano & Kase, 2008

= Micronerita pulchella =

Species of gastropod

Micronerita pulchella is a species of submarine cave snail, a marine gastropod mollusk in the family Neritiliidae.
