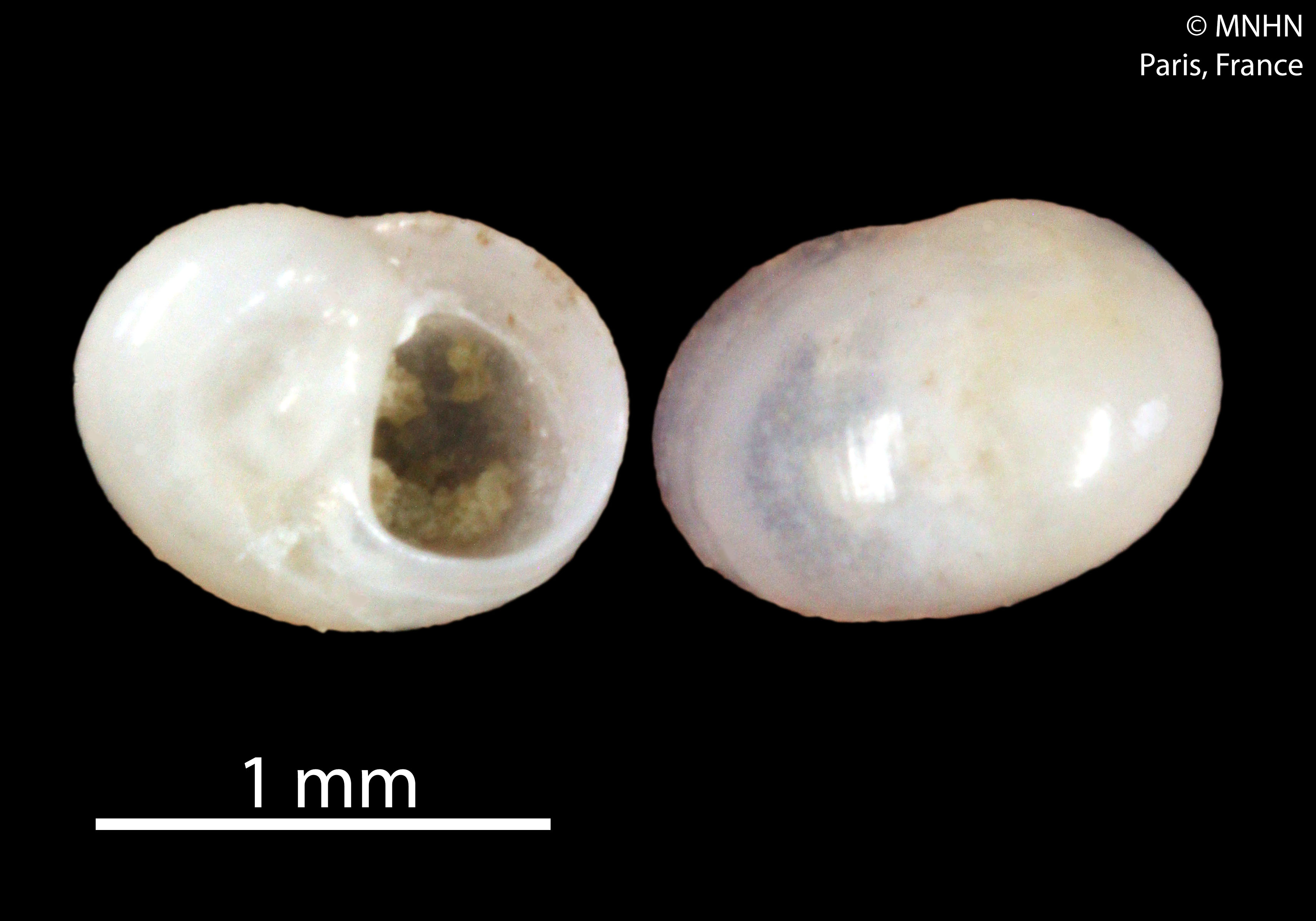
- Shell of Teinostomops singularis (paratype at MNHN, Paris)

Scientific classification
- Kingdom: Animalia
- Phylum: Mollusca
- Class: Gastropoda
- Order: Cycloneritida
- Family: Neritiliidae
- Genus: Teinostomops
- Species: T. singularis

Binomial name
- Teinostomops singularis Kano & Kase, 2008

= Teinostomops singularis =

Species of gastropod

Teinostomops singularis is a species of submarine cave snail, a marine gastropod mollusk in the family Neritiliidae.
