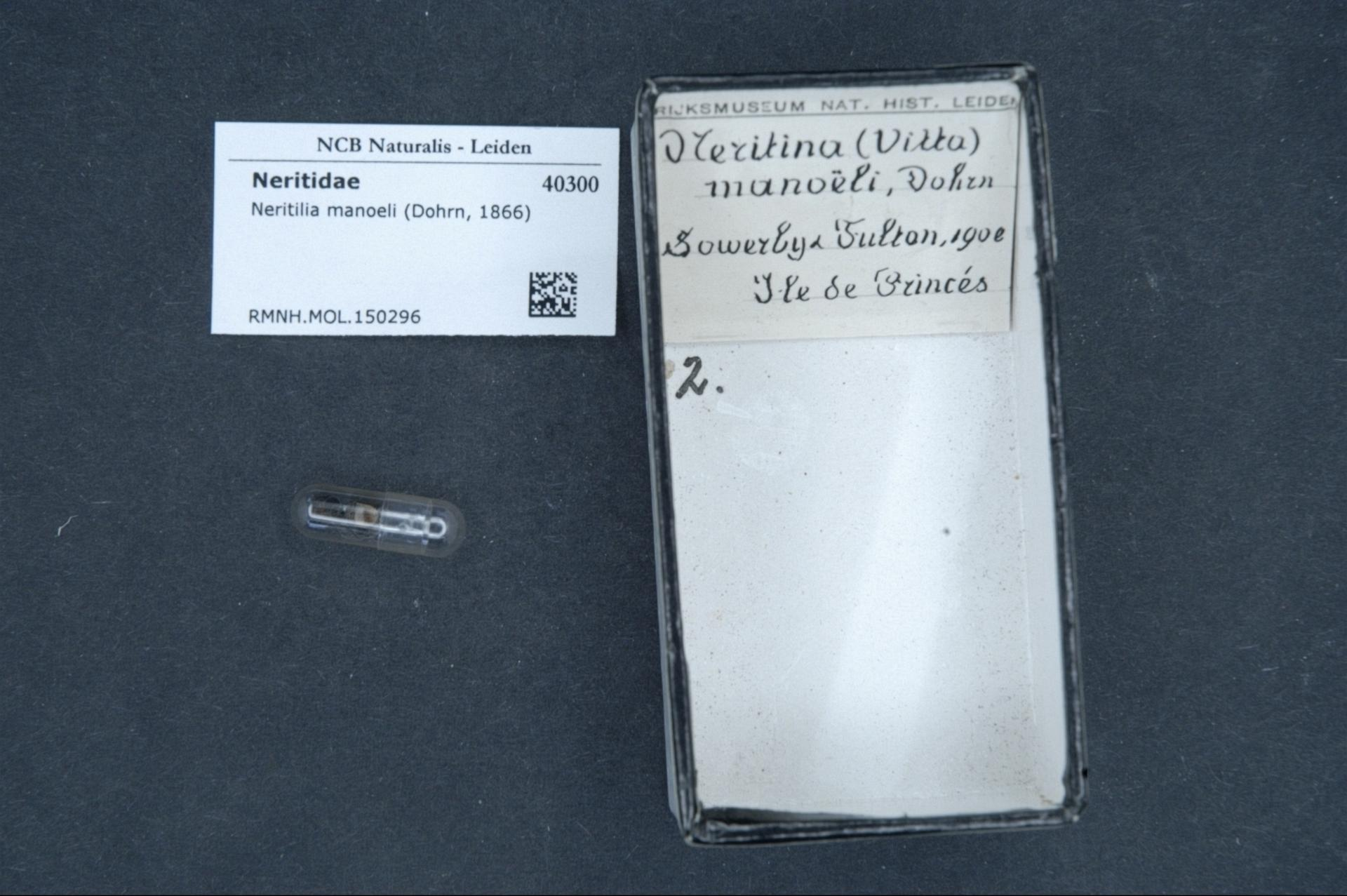
- Neritilia manoeli shells

Conservation status
- Least Concern (IUCN 3.1)

Scientific classification
- Kingdom: Animalia
- Phylum: Mollusca
- Class: Gastropoda
- Subclass: Neritimorpha
- Order: Cycloneritida
- Family: Neritiliidae
- Genus: Neritilia
- Species: N. manoeli

Binomial name
- Neritilia manoeli (Dohrn, 1866)

Synonyms
- Neritina manoeli (Dohrn, 1866)

= Neritilia manoeli =

Species of gastropod

Neritilia manoeli is a species of minute freshwater snail with an operculum, an aquatic gastropod mollusc or micromollusk in the family Neritiliidae.

The survival of this species is threatened by habitat loss. They are found in Principe Island, Sao Tome Island, Bibundi, and Victoria (on aquatic plants).

The width of the adult shell is 4 mm.

== Ecology ==
=== Distribution ===
This species is found on São Tomé and Príncipe and in Cameroon.

=== Habitat ===
The ecological habitat for this nerite is inland wetlands, such as rivers.
