= Neritilia vulgaris =

Scientific classification
- Kingdom: Animalia
- Phylum: Mollusca
- Class: Gastropoda
- Order: Cycloneritida
- Family: Neritiliidae
- Genus: Neritilia
- Species: N. vulgaris

Binomial name
- Neritilia vulgaris Kano & Kase, 2003

Species of gastropod

Neritilia vulgaris is a species of submarine cave snail, a marine gastropod mollusc in the family Neritiliidae.
