= Platynerita rufa =

Scientific classification
- Kingdom: Animalia
- Phylum: Mollusca
- Class: Gastropoda
- Order: Cycloneritida
- Family: Neritiliidae
- Genus: Platynerita
- Species: P. rufa

Binomial name
- Platynerita rufa Kano & Kase, 2003

Species of gastropod

Platynerita rufa is a species of submarine cave snail, a marine gastropod mollusk in the family Neritiliidae.
