= Neritilia littoralis =

Scientific classification
- Kingdom: Animalia
- Phylum: Mollusca
- Class: Gastropoda
- Order: Cycloneritida
- Family: Neritiliidae
- Genus: Neritilia
- Species: N. littoralis

Binomial name
- Neritilia littoralis Kano, Kase & Kubo, 2003

Species of gastropod

Neritilia littoralis is a species of submarine cave snail, a marine gastropod mollusc in the family Neritiliidae.
