= Laddia lamellata =

Scientific classification
- Kingdom: Animalia
- Phylum: Mollusca
- Class: Gastropoda
- Order: Cycloneritida
- Family: Neritiliidae
- Genus: Laddia
- Species: L. lamellata

Binomial name
- Laddia lamellata Kano & Kase, 2008

Species of gastropod

Laddia lamellata is a species of submarine cave snail, a marine gastropod mollusc in the family Neritiliidae.
