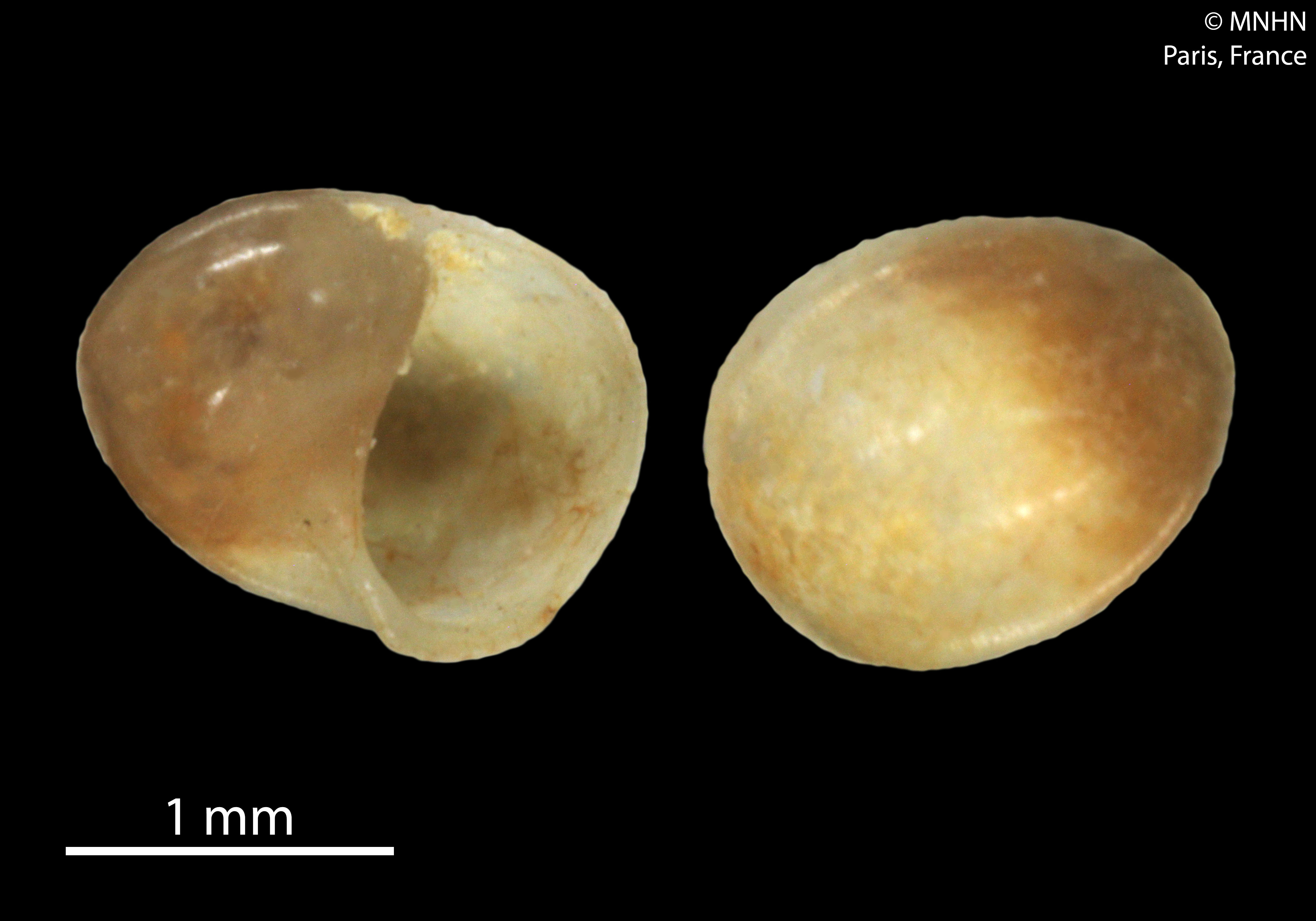
- Shell of Siaesella fragilis

Scientific classification
- Kingdom: Animalia
- Phylum: Mollusca
- Class: Gastropoda
- Order: Cycloneritida
- Superfamily: Helicinoidea
- Family: Neritiliidae
- Genus: Siaesella; Kano & Kase, 2008

Type species
- Siaesella fragilis Kano & Kase, 2008

= Siaesella =

Genus of gastropods

Siaesella is a genus of submarine cave snails, marine gastropod mollusks in the family Neritiliidae.

== Species ==
Species within the genus Siaesella include:

- Siaesella fragilis Kano & Kase, 2008
