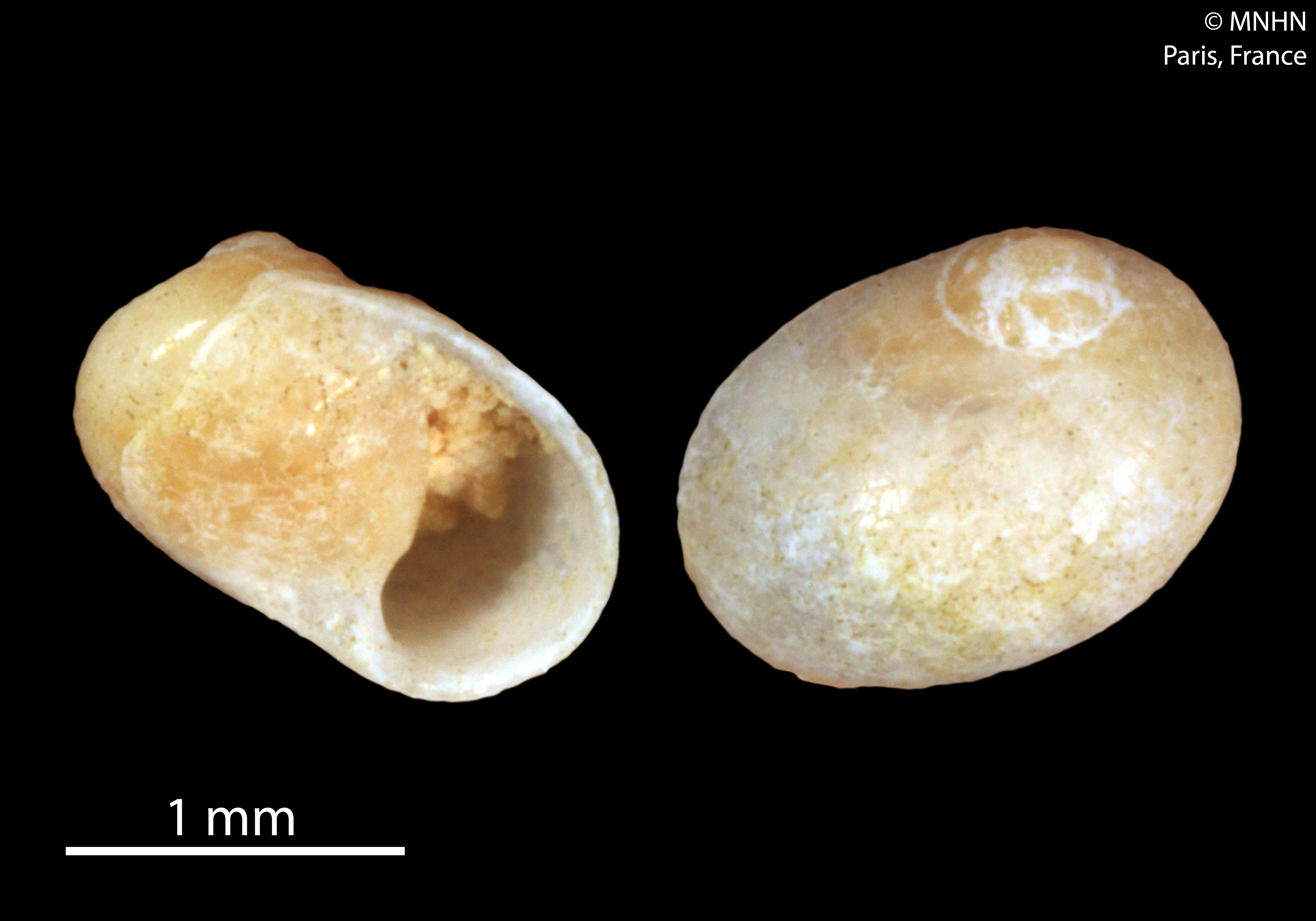
- Shell of Micronerita pulchella (paratype at MNHN, Paris)

Scientific classification
- Kingdom: Animalia
- Phylum: Mollusca
- Class: Gastropoda
- Order: Cycloneritida
- Family: Neritiliidae
- Genus: Micronerita; Kano & Kase, 2008

Type species
- Micronerita pulchella Kano & Kase, 2008

= Micronerita =

Genus of gastropods

Micronerita is a genus of submarine cave snails, marine gastropod mollusks in the family Neritiliidae.

== Species ==
Species within the genus Micronerita include:

- Micronerita pulchella Kano & Kase, 2008
