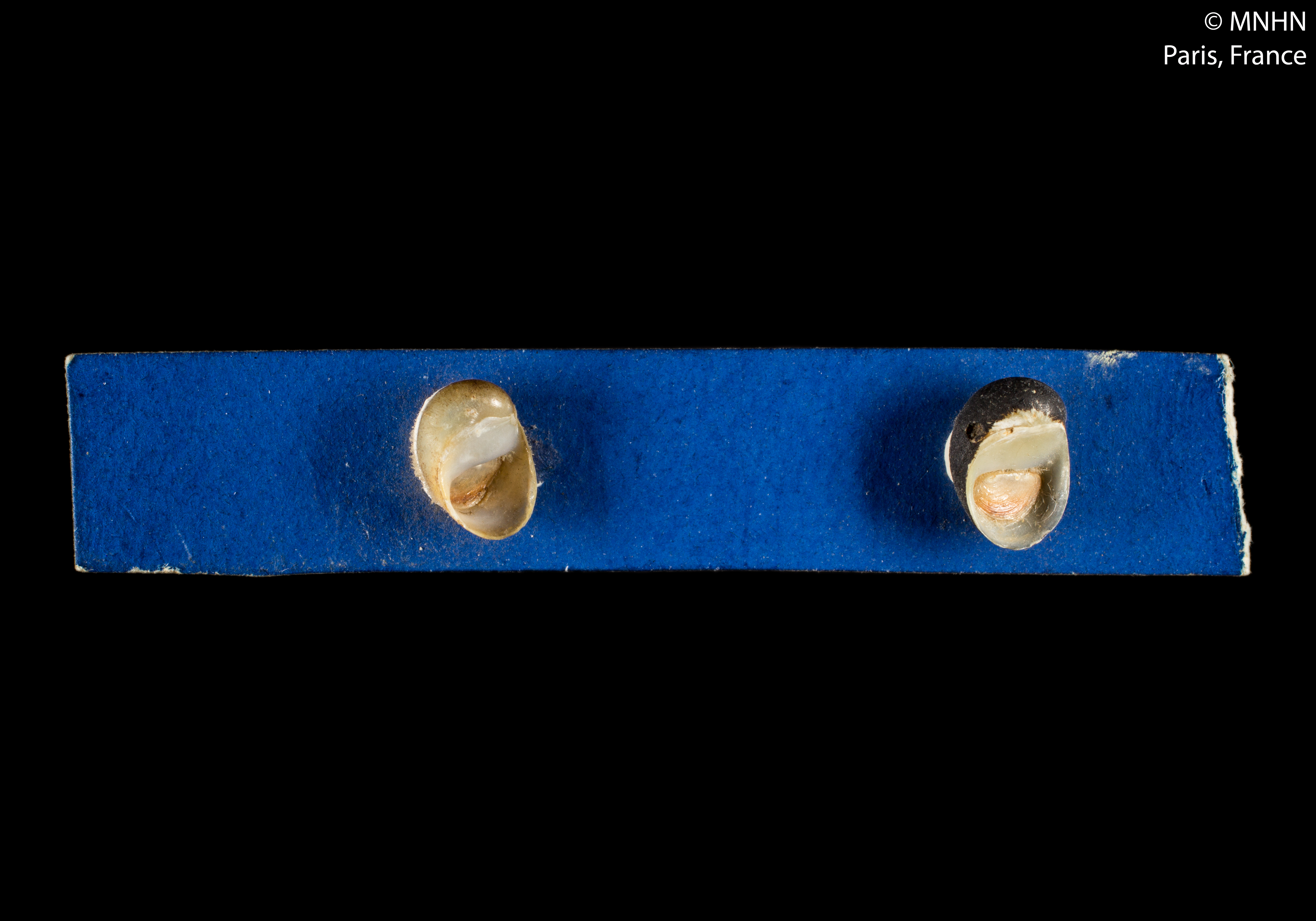
- Neritilia succinea shells (syntype at MNHN, Paris)

Scientific classification
- Kingdom: Animalia
- Phylum: Mollusca
- Class: Gastropoda
- Order: Cycloneritida
- Superfamily: Helicinoidea
- Family: Neritiliidae
- Genus: Neritilia von Martens, 1879

Type species
- Nerita peloronta Linnaeus, 1758

Synonyms
- Calceolata Iredale, 1918 (Replacement name for Calceolina A. Adams, 1863, non Rafinesque, 1815); Calceolina A. Adams, 1863 (Invalid: junior homonym of Calceolina Rafinesque, 1815; Calceolata is a replacement name); Neritina (Neritilia) Martens, 1875 (original rank); Teinostoma (Calceolata) Iredale, 1918

= Neritilia =

Genus of gastropods

Neritilia is a genus of freshwater snails which live near the sea coast in submarine caves. They have an operculum, and are aquatic gastropod mollusks in the family Neritiliidae.

== Species ==
Species within the genus Neritilia include:

- Neritilia abeli Espinosa, Ortea & Diez-García, 2017
- †Neritilia bisinuata Lozouet, 2004
- Neritilia cavernicola Kano & Kase, 2004
- Neritilia hawaiiensis Kay, 1979 - anchialine pool snail
- †Neritilia lawsoni Symonds & Tracey, 2014
- Neritilia littoralis Kano, Kase & Kubo, 2003
- Neritilia manoeli (Dohrn, 1866)
- Neritilia margaritae Pérez-Dionis, Espinosa & Ortea, 2010
- Neritilia mariaella Espinosa & Ortea, 2018
- Neritilia mimotoi Kano, Sasaki & Ishikawa, 2001
- † Neritilia neritinoides (Cossmann & Peyrot, 1918)
- Neritilia panamensis Morrison, 1946
- Neritilia pusilla (C.B. Adams, 1850)
- Neritilia rubida (Pease, 1865) - type species
- Neritilia serrana Espinosa, Ortea & Diez-García, 2017
- Neritilia succinea (Récluz, 1841)
- Neritilia vulgaris Kano & Kase, 2003

Species brought into synonymy

- Neritilia consimilis Martens, 1897: synonym of Neritilia rubida (Pease, 1865) (junior synonym)
- Neritilia traceyi Ladd, 1965: synonym of Laddia traceyi (Ladd, 1965)
