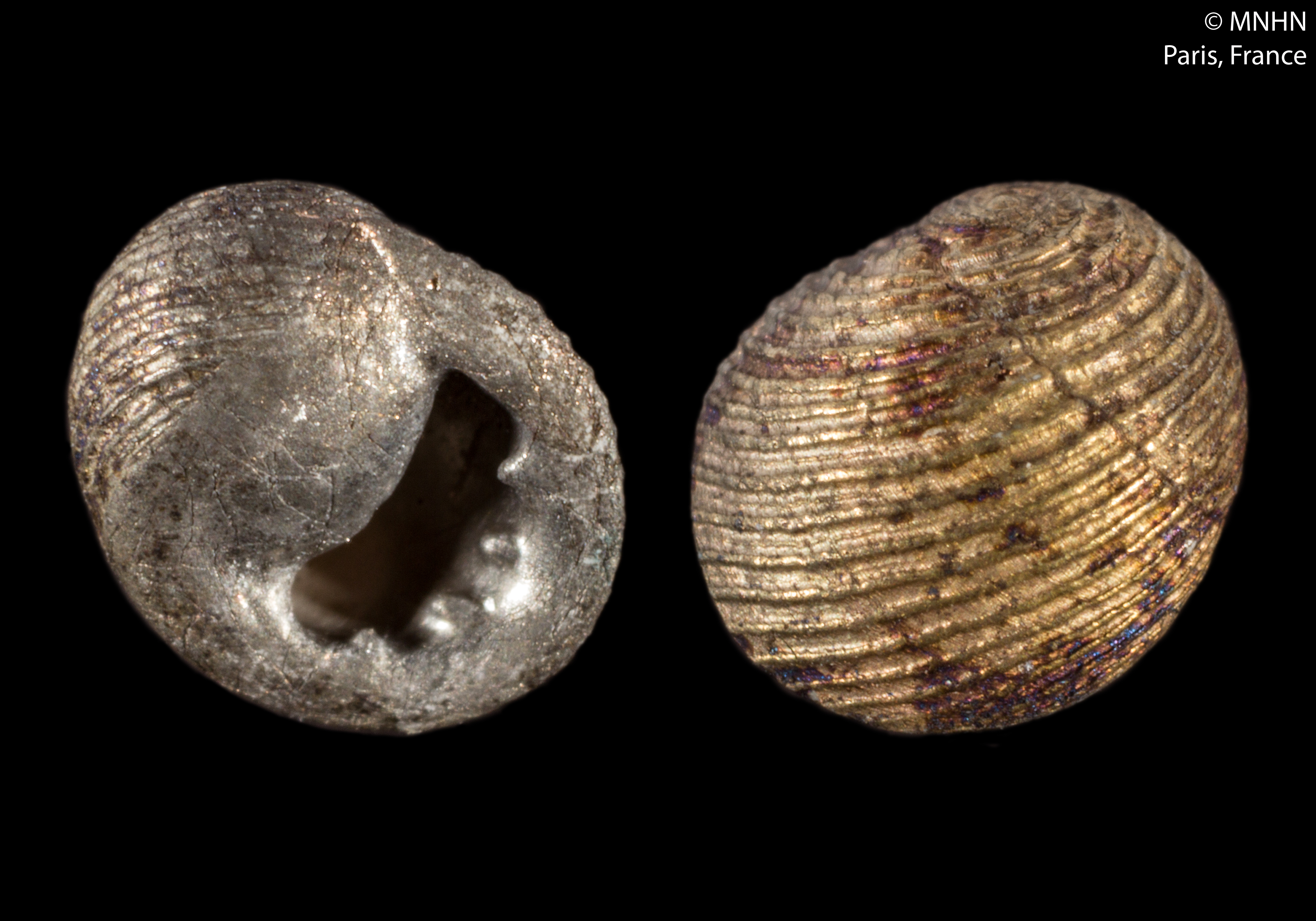
- Shell of † Bourdieria faviai (paratype at MNHN, Paris)

Scientific classification
- Kingdom: Animalia
- Phylum: Mollusca
- Class: Gastropoda
- Order: Cycloneritida
- Superfamily: Helicinoidea
- Family: Neritiliidae
- Genus: †Bourdieria; Lozouet, 2004

= Bourdieria =

Extinct genus of gastropods

Bourdieria is an extinct genus of marine snails, gastropod mollusks in the family Neritiliidae.

== Species ==
Species within the genus Bourdieria include:

- † Bourdieria faviai Lozouet, 2004
