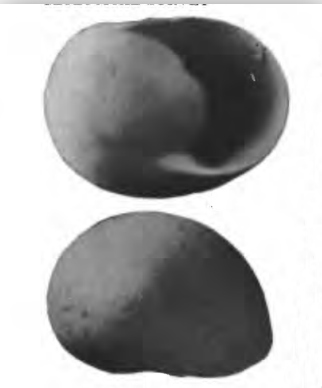
- Shell of Pisulina adamsiana

Scientific classification
- Kingdom: Animalia
- Phylum: Mollusca
- Class: Gastropoda
- Order: Cycloneritida
- Family: Neritiliidae
- Genus: Pisulina; G. Nevill & H. Nevill, 1869

= Pisulina =

Genus of gastropods

Pisulina is a genus of submarine cave snails, marine gastropod molluscs in the family Neritiliidae.

== Species ==
Species within the genus Pisulina include:

- Pisulina adamsiana G. Nevill & H. Nevill, 1869
- Pisulina biplicata Thiele, 1925
- Pisulina maxima Kano & Kase, 2000
- † Pisulina subpacifica Ladd, 1966
- Pisulina tenuis Kano & Kase, 2000
