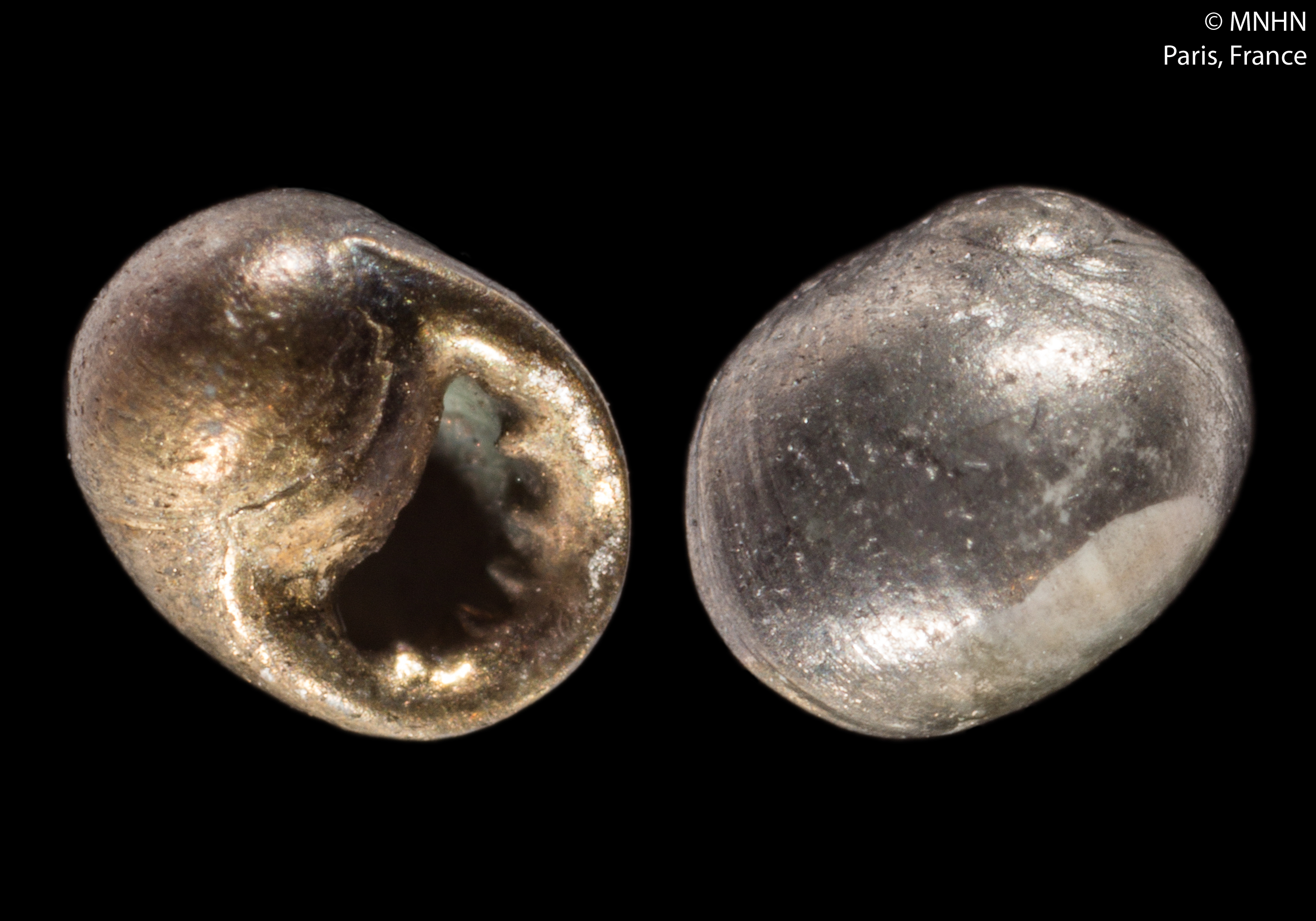
- Shell of † Pisulinella aucoini (holotype at MNHN, Paris)

Scientific classification
- Kingdom: Animalia
- Phylum: Mollusca
- Class: Gastropoda
- Order: Cycloneritida
- Family: Neritiliidae
- Genus: †Pisulinella; Kano & Kase, 2000

Type species
- † Pisulinella pacifica Kano & Kase, 2000

= Pisulinella =

Genus of gastropods

Pisulinella is an extinct genus of submarine cave snails, marine gastropod mollusks in the family Neritiliidae.

== Species ==
Species within the genus Pisulinella include:

- † Pisulinella aucoini Lozouet, 2004
- † Pisulinella miocenica Kano & Kase, 2000
- † Pisulinella pacifica Kano & Kase, 2000
