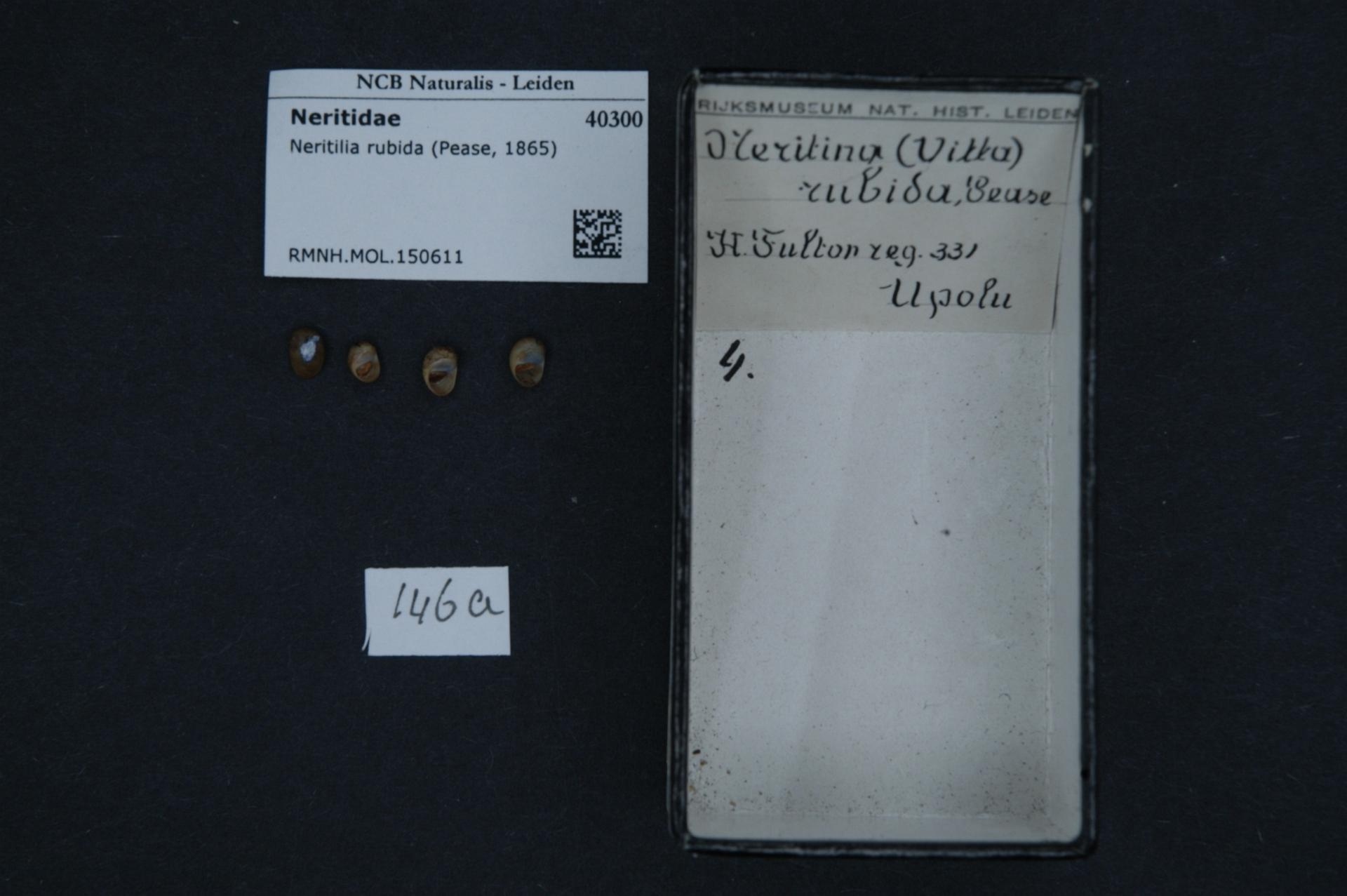
- Neritilia rubida shells

Scientific classification
- Kingdom: Animalia
- Phylum: Mollusca
- Class: Gastropoda
- Order: Cycloneritida
- Family: Neritiliidae
- Genus: Neritilia
- Species: N. rubida

Binomial name
- Neritilia rubida (Pease, 1865)

Synonyms
- Neritilia consimilis (E. von Martens, 1879) (junior synonym); Neritina consimilis Martens, 1879; Neritina rubida Pease, 1865

= Neritilia rubida =

Species of gastropod

Neritilia rubida is a species of submarine cave snail, a marine gastropod mollusc in the family Neritiliidae.

Neritilia rubida is the type species of the genus Neritilia.
