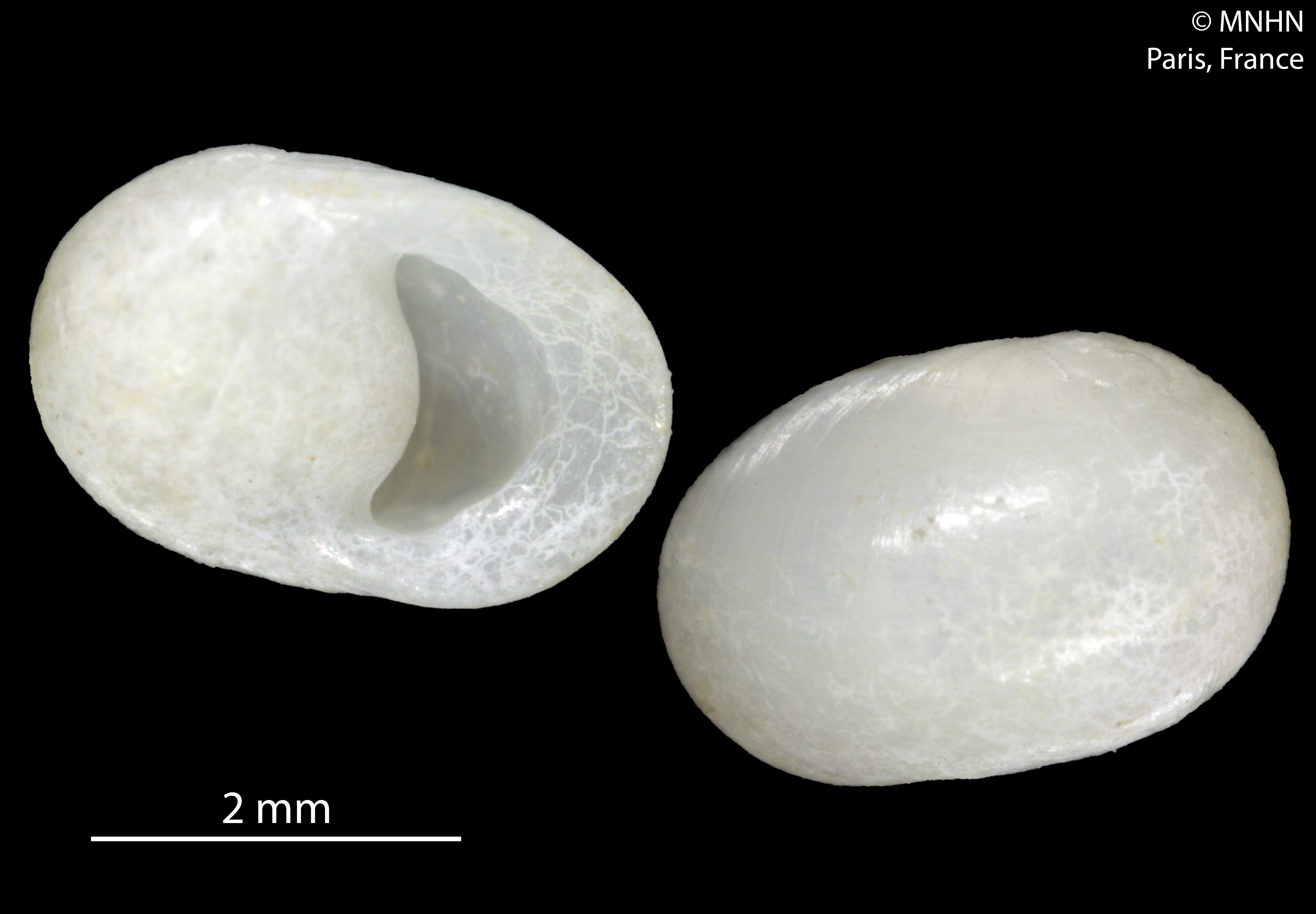
- Shell of Laddia traceyi (specimen at MNHN, Paris)

Scientific classification
- Kingdom: Animalia
- Phylum: Mollusca
- Class: Gastropoda
- Order: Cycloneritida
- Superfamily: Helicinoidea
- Family: Neritiliidae
- Genus: Laddia; Kano & Kase, 2008

Type species
- Neritilia traceyi Ladd, 1965

= Laddia =

Genus of gastropods

Laddia is a genus of submarine cave snails, marine gastropod mollusks in the family Neritiliidae.

== Species ==
Species within the genus Laddia include:

- Laddia lamellata Kano & Kase, 2008
- Laddia traceyi (Ladd, 1965)
