= Platynerita =

Scientific classification
- Kingdom: Animalia
- Phylum: Mollusca
- Class: Gastropoda
- Order: Cycloneritida
- Family: Neritiliidae
- Genus: Platynerita

Genus of gastropods

Platynerita is a genus of submarine cave snails, marine gastropod mollusks in the family Neritiliidae.

== Species ==
Species within the genus Platynerita include:

- Platynerita rufa Kano & Kase, 2003
