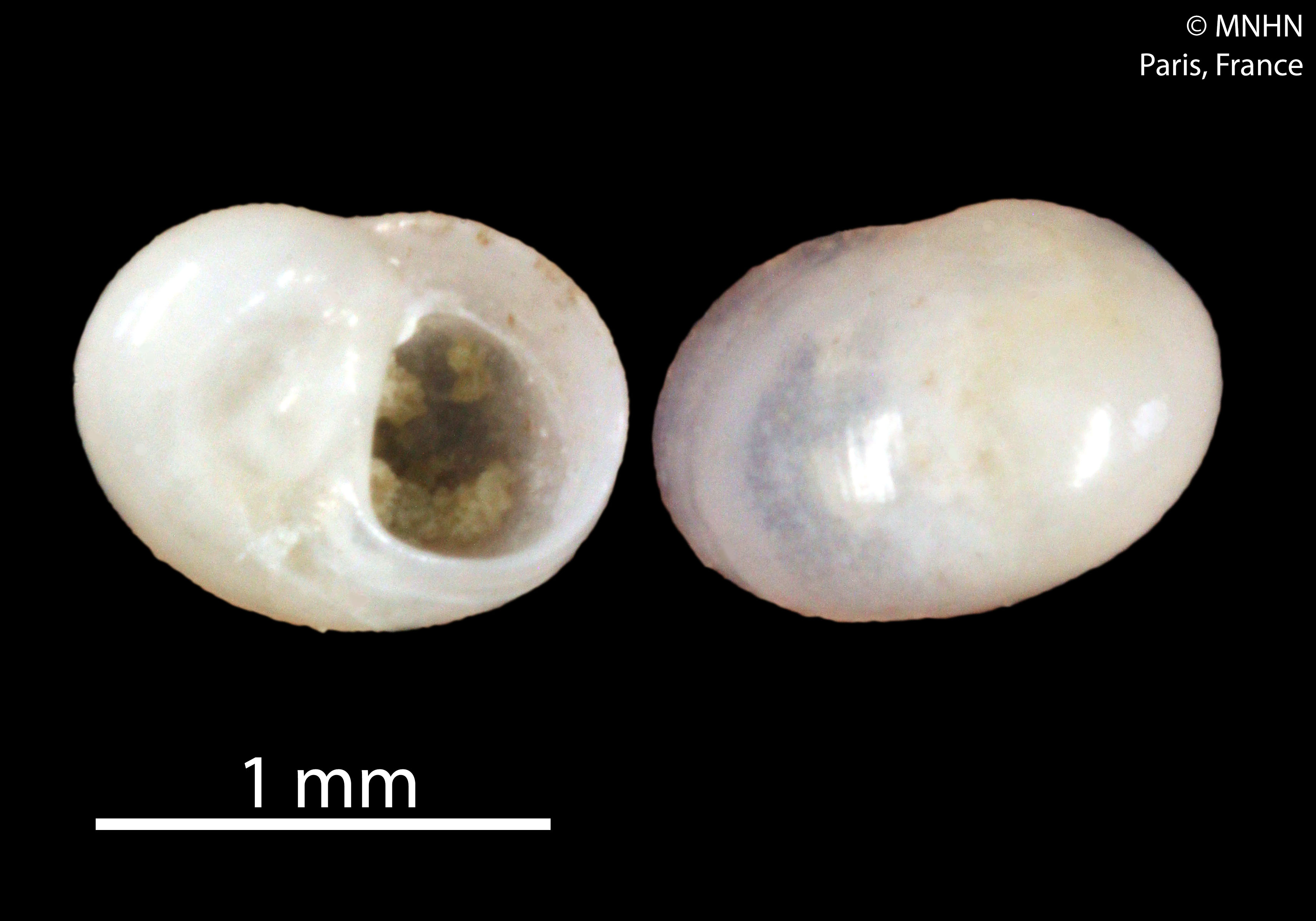
- Teinostomops singularis (paratype at MNHN, Paris)

Scientific classification
- Kingdom: Animalia
- Phylum: Mollusca
- Class: Gastropoda
- Order: Cycloneritida
- Superfamily: Helicinoidea
- Family: Neritiliidae
- Genus: Teinostomops; Kano & Kase, 2008

Type species
- Teinostomops singularis Kano & Kase, 2008

= Teinostomops =

Genus of gastropods

Teinostomops is a genus of submarine cave snails, marine gastropod mollusks in the family Neritiliidae.

== Species ==
Species within the genus Teinostomops include:

- Teinostomops singularis Kano & Kase, 2008
