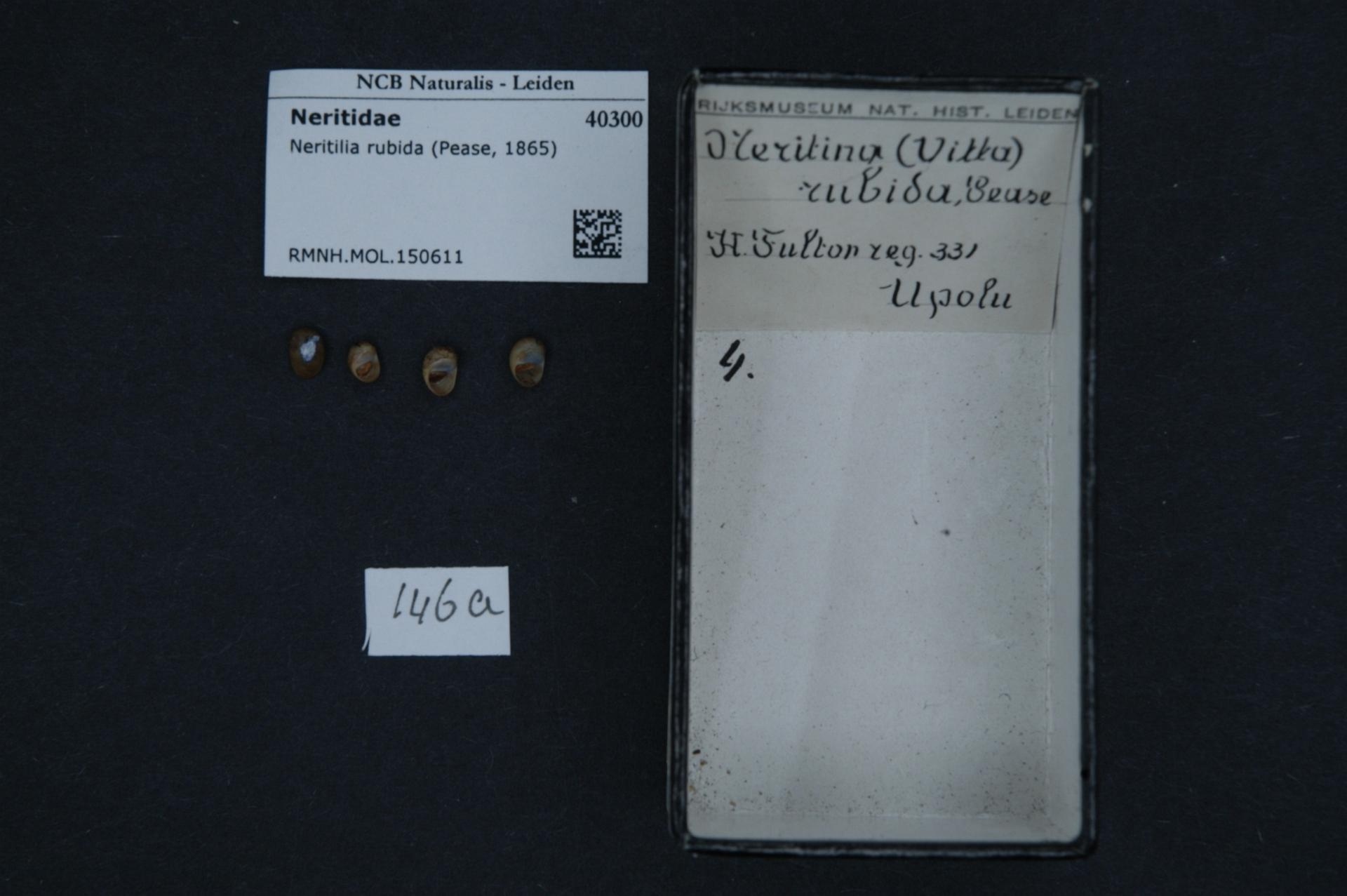
- Neritilia rubida shells

Scientific classification
- Kingdom: Animalia
- Phylum: Mollusca
- Class: Gastropoda
- Subclass: Neritimorpha
- Order: Cycloneritida
- Superfamily: Helicinoidea
- Family: Neritiliidae; Schepman, 1908

Genera
- See text

= Neritiliidae =

Family of gastropods

Neritiliidae is a family of submarine cave snails, marine gastropod mollusks or micromollusks in the clade Cycloneritimorpha (according to the taxonomy of the Gastropoda by Bouchet & Rocroi, 2005).

Original spelling was Neritilidae. This family has no subfamilies according to the taxonomy of the Gastropoda by Bouchet & Rocroi, 2005.

Five species are freshwater.

== Genera ==
Genera within the family Neritiliidae include:

- Bourdieria Lozouet, 2004 †
- Laddia Kano & Kase, 2008
- Micronerita Kano & Kase, 2008
- Neritilia Martens, 1875 - type genus of the family Neritiliidae, synonyms: Calceolata Iredale, 1918; Calceolina A. Adams, 1863
- Pisulina G. Nevill & H. Nevill, 1869
- Pisulinella Kano & Kase, 2000 †
- Platynerita Kano & Kase, 2003
- Septariellina
- Siaesella Kano & Kase, 2008
- Teinostomops Kano & Kase, 2008
