= Alcadia hollandi =

Scientific classification
- Kingdom: Animalia
- Phylum: Mollusca
- Class: Gastropoda
- Order: Cycloneritida
- Family: Helicinidae
- Genus: Alcadia
- Species: A. hollandi

Binomial name
- Alcadia hollandi (C. B. Adams, 1849)

Synonyms
- Alcadia (Palliata) hollandi (C. B. Adams, 1849) alternative representation; Helicina (Alcadia) hollandi C. B. Adams, 1849 superseded combination; Helicina hollandi C. B. Adams, 1849 (basionym)

Species of gastropod

Alcadia hollandi is a species of an operculate land snail, terrestrial gastropod mollusk in the family Helicinidae.

== Description ==
(Original description) This species is similar to Alcadia brownii, but the shell is significantly smaller and thinner. It is primarily distinguished by its shallower incision, which is only half as deep, and by the elongated columella. Unlike A. brownii, the columella of this species lacks an impressed line or groove, although it is slightly raised at the margins.

== Distribution ==
This species occurs in Jamaica.
