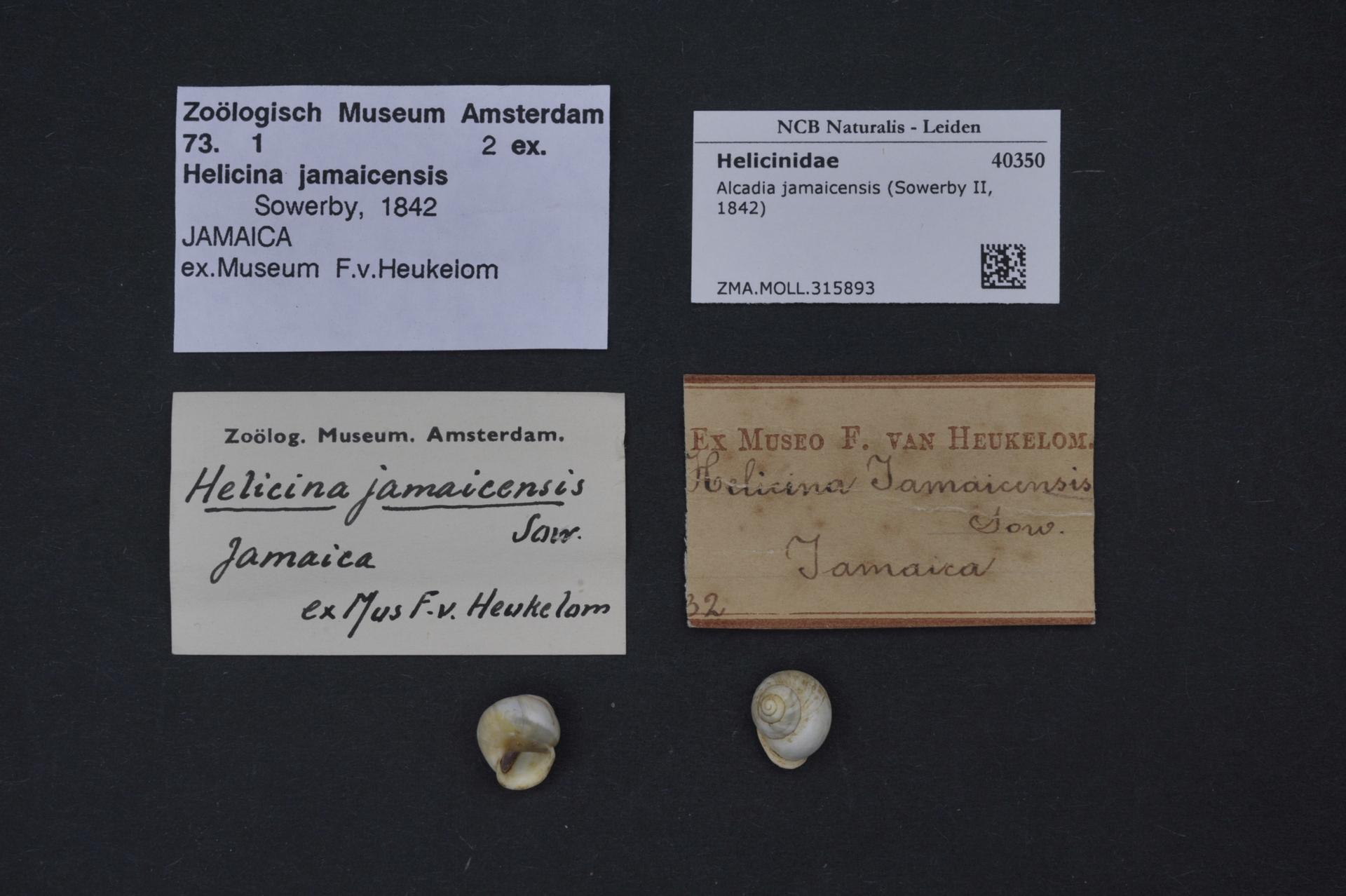
- Shell of Alcadia jamaicensis (specimen at Naturalis Biodiversity Center

Scientific classification
- Kingdom: Animalia
- Phylum: Mollusca
- Class: Gastropoda
- Order: Cycloneritida
- Family: Helicinidae
- Genus: Alcadia
- Species: A. jamaicensis

Binomial name
- Alcadia jamaicensis (G. B. Sowerby II, 1842)

Synonyms
- Alcadia (Leialcadia) ampliata fuscocallosa A. J. Wagner, 1908 junior subjective synonym; Helicina (Pachystoma) jamaicensis G. B. Sowerby II, 1842 alternative representation; Helicina ampliata fuscocallosa A. J. Wagner, 1907; Helicina jamaicensis G. B. Sowerby II, 1842 (original combination)

= Alcadia jamaicensis =

Species of gastropod

Alcadia jamaicensis is a species of an operculate land snail, terrestrial gastropod mollusk in the family Helicinidae.

== Description ==
(Original description in Latin) The shell is very similar to Alcadia aurantia (J. E. Gray, 1824), but is more conical and thinner. The peristome is paler and less thickened. The edge of the aperture is thinner.

== Distribution ==
This species occurs in Jamaica.
