= Alcadia affinis =

Scientific classification
- Kingdom: Animalia
- Phylum: Mollusca
- Class: Gastropoda
- Order: Cycloneritida
- Family: Helicinidae
- Genus: Alcadia
- Species: A. affinis

Binomial name
- Alcadia affinis (C. B. Adams, 1846)

Synonyms
- Alcadia (Hjalmarsona) affinis (C. B. Adams, 1846) alternative representation; Helicina affinis C. B. Adams, 1846 (original combination); Helicina gloynei Bland, 1872 (junior synonym)

Species of gastropod

Alcadia affinis is a species of an operculate land snail, terrestrial gastropod mollusk in the family Helicinidae.

== Description ==
(Original description in Latin) This species is similar to Alcadia solitaria (C. B. Adams, 1845), but the shell is not convex, but arranged in a conical spiral. The outer lip is reflexed, angled below and not split.

== Distribution ==
This species occurs on Jamaica.
