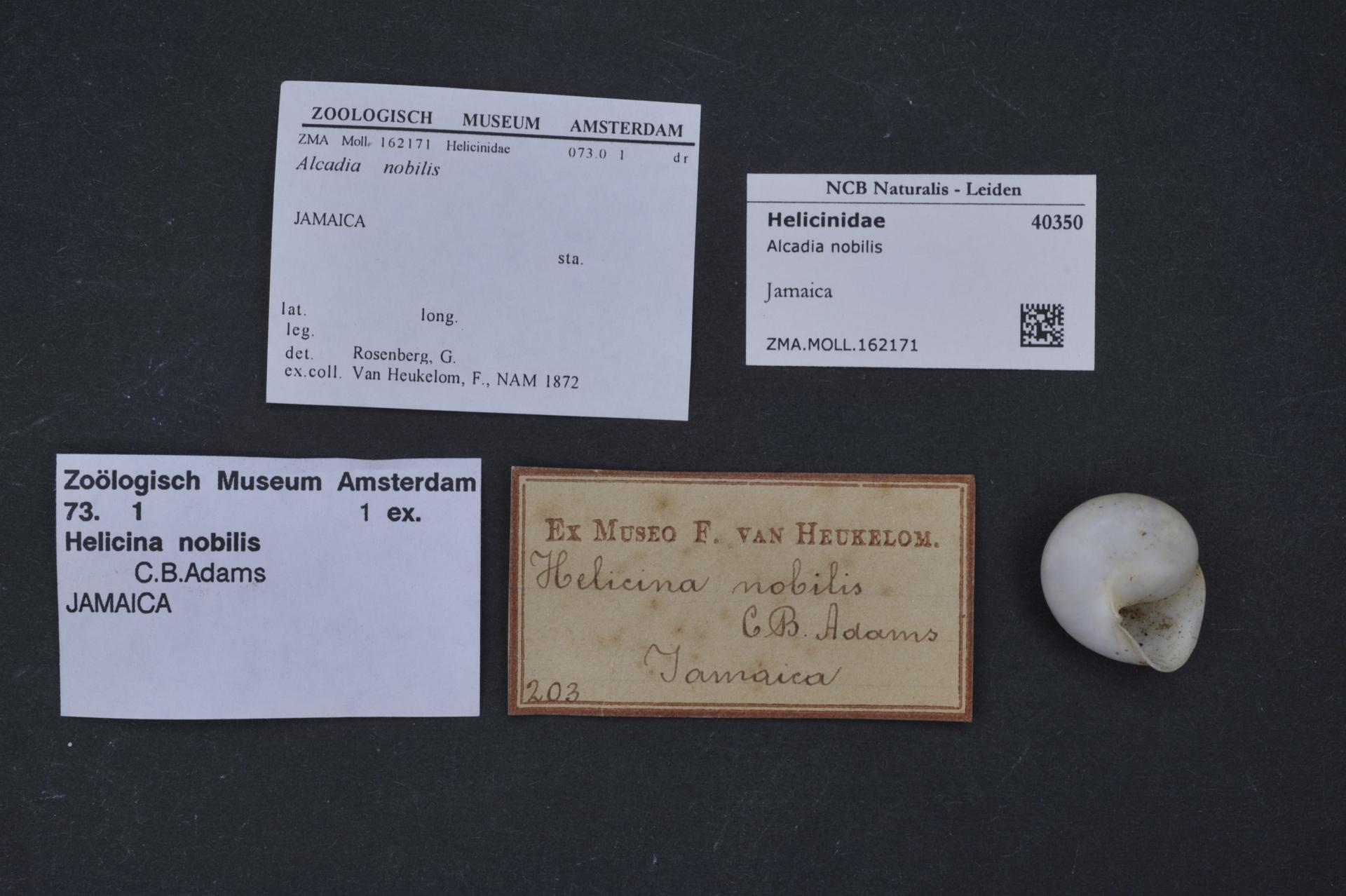
- Shell of Alcadia nobilis (specimen at Naturalis Biodiversity Center)

Scientific classification
- Kingdom: Animalia
- Phylum: Mollusca
- Class: Gastropoda
- Order: Cycloneritida
- Family: Helicinidae
- Genus: Alcadia
- Species: A. nobilis

Binomial name
- Alcadia nobilis (C. B. Adams, 1851)

Synonyms
- Helicina nobilis C. B. Adams, 1851

= Alcadia nobilis =

Species of gastropod

Alcadia nobilis is a species of an operculate land snail, terrestrial gastropod mollusk in the family Helicinidae.

== Description ==
(Original description) The shell is depressed globose-conic, thick, and solid. It is white beneath and at the end of the body whorl, while the rest of the shell is rufous or dark brownish red. The surface is very smooth, with very light growth striae and occasionally a few very light spiral striae. The apex is obtuse, and the spire is convex conic. The shell has nearly four and a half subplanulate whorls with a rather deep suture. The body whorl is much depressed or even sinuate between the periphery and the suture at its termination. The aperture is compressed above and expanded laterally. The outer lip is rather thick and moderately reflected along the middle only, featuring a notch similar to that of Alcadia maxima G.B. Sowerby II, 1842.

== Distribution ==
This species occurs in Jamaica.
