= Alcadia pusilla =

Scientific classification
- Kingdom: Animalia
- Phylum: Mollusca
- Class: Gastropoda
- Order: Cycloneritida
- Family: Helicinidae
- Genus: Alcadia
- Species: A. pusilla

Binomial name
- Alcadia pusilla (C. B. Adams, 1850)

Synonyms
- Alcadia (Palliata) pusilla (C. B. Adams, 1850) alternative representation; Alcadia pusilla var. intermedia Pilsbry, 1909 (junior homonym of Helicina...); Helicina pusilla C. B. Adams, 1850 (original combination)

Species of gastropod

Alcadia pusilla is a species of an operculate land snail, terrestrial gastropod mollusk in the family Helicinidae.

== Description ==
The shell of adult snails has a depressed globular shape. It has a horn color that can appear brownish. It features extremely fine growth striae and a subacute apex. The spire is moderately elevated with curvilinear outlines. The shell has more than four slightly convex whorls with a distinct suture. The aperture is rather large, well-rounded on the right side, and somewhat sinuate on the left side. The outer lip is thin, moderately dilated, and well-reflected, with a deep curved incision similar to that of Alcadia brownii palliata (C. B. Adams, 1849), located just below the columella, whose end is sickle-shaped. This species is much less discoidal than Alcadia macilenta (C. B. Adams, 1849).

== Distribution ==
This species occurs in Jamaica.
