= Alcadia erythrozona =

Scientific classification
- Domain: Eukaryota
- Kingdom: Animalia
- Phylum: Mollusca
- Class: Gastropoda
- Subclass: Neritimorpha
- Order: Cycloneritida
- Family: Helicinidae
- Genus: Alcadia
- Species: A. erythrozona

Binomial name
- Alcadia erythrozona Dean, 1931

Synonyms
- Alcadia (Hjalmarsona) erythrozona Dean, 1931 alternative representation

Species of gastropod

Alcadia erythrozona is a species of an operculate land snail, terrestrial gastropod mollusk in the family Helicinidae.

== Distribution ==
This species occurs in Jamaica.
