= Alcadia gonavensis =

Scientific classification
- Domain: Eukaryota
- Kingdom: Animalia
- Phylum: Mollusca
- Class: Gastropoda
- Subclass: Neritimorpha
- Order: Cycloneritida
- Family: Helicinidae
- Genus: Alcadia
- Species: A. gonavensis

Binomial name
- Alcadia gonavensis Weinland, 1880

Species of gastropod

Alcadia gonavensis is a species of an operculate land snail, terrestrial gastropod mollusk in the family Helicinidae.

== Description ==
(Original description in Latin) The shell is globosely depressed, somewhat solid, and slightly shiny, with fine oblique striations visible under a strong lens. It is whitish or reddish in color. The spire is depressed and broadly conical. There are 5 whorls, slightly increasing in size, with the first 4 being almost flat and the body whorl rounded. The aperture is oblique and triangularly semi-oval. The columella is short, receding, and excavated, ending in a sharp tooth, and emitting a thin, well-defined callus above. The peristome is somewhat callous, slightly expanded, and separated by a notch and a small tooth on the columella.

== Distribution ==
This species occurs in Haiti, Hispaniola.
