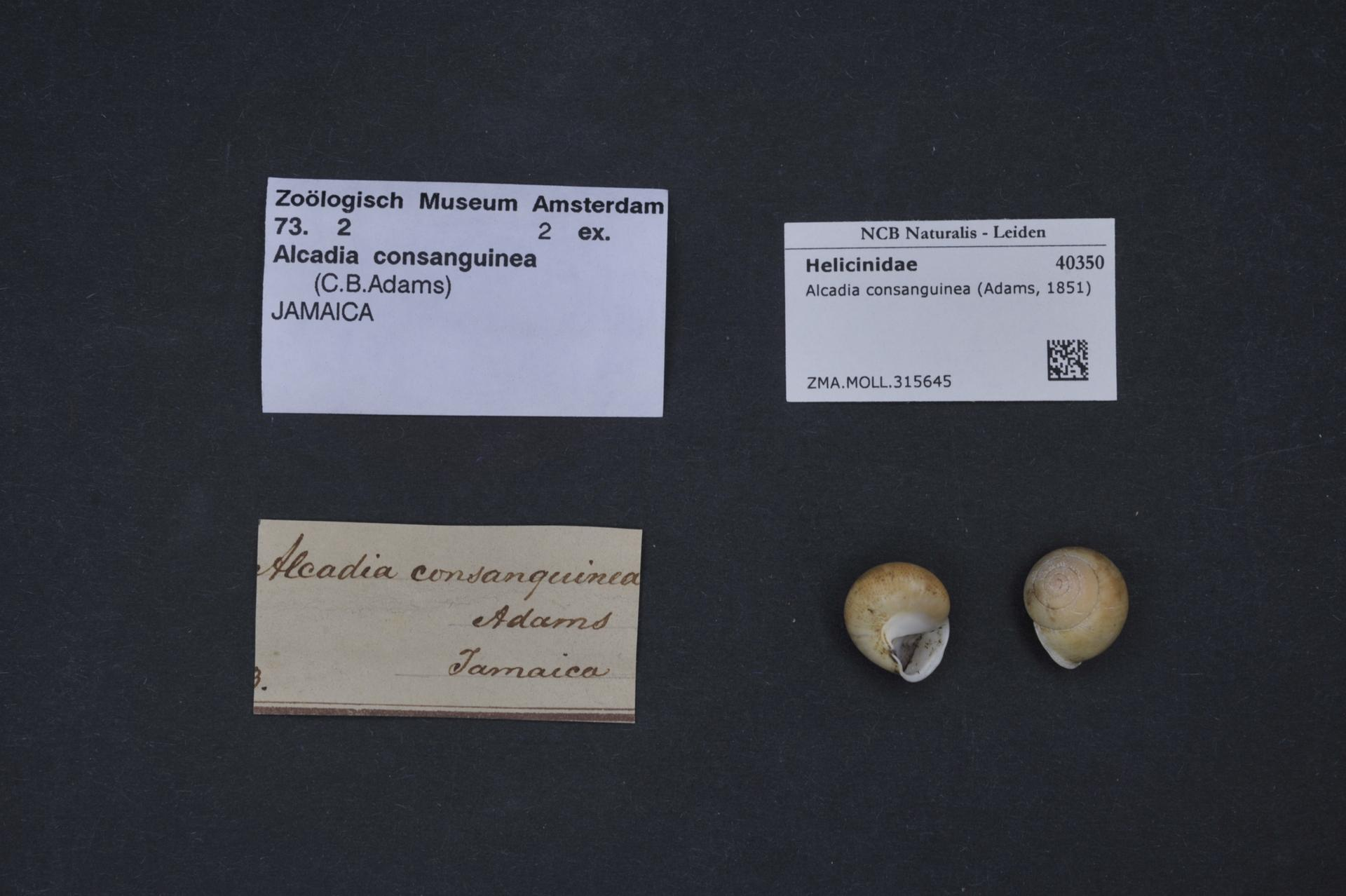
- Shell of Alcadia consanguinea (specimen at Naturalis Biodiversity Center)

Scientific classification
- Kingdom: Animalia
- Phylum: Mollusca
- Class: Gastropoda
- Order: Cycloneritida
- Family: Helicinidae
- Genus: Alcadia
- Species: A. consanguinea

Binomial name
- Alcadia consanguinea (C. B. Adams, 1851)

Synonyms
- Alcadia (Palliata) consanguinea (C. B. Adams, 1851) alternative representation; Helicina (Alcadia) palliata var. consanguinea C. B. Adams, 1851 superseded combination; Helicina consanguinea C. B. Adams, 1851 (original combination); Helicina soror C. B. Adams, 1851 (junior synonym)

= Alcadia consanguinea =

Species of gastropod

Alcadia consanguinea is a species of an operculate land snail, terrestrial gastropod mollusk in the family Helicinidae.

== Description ==
(Original description) The shell is subglobose and moderately thick, characterized by a dark brownish-red color with a white lip. It features a somewhat hirsute epidermis with spirally arranged projecting points and quite distinct growth striae. The apex is obtuse, and the spire has significantly curved outlines. The shell comprises five moderately convex whorls with a well-impressed suture. The aperture is semi-orbicular, with a sinuous outer lip that is moderately thickened and sharp, yet well-reflected except at the extremities. The shell also has a broad and shallow slit.

== Distribution ==
This species occurs in Jamaica.
