= Alcadia mcleani =

Scientific classification
- Kingdom: Animalia
- Phylum: Mollusca
- Class: Gastropoda
- Order: Cycloneritida
- Family: Helicinidae
- Genus: Alcadia
- Species: A. mcleani

Binomial name
- Alcadia mcleani Clench, 1937

Species of gastropod

Alcadia mcleani is a species of an operculate land snail, terrestrial gastropod mollusk in the family Helicinidae.

== Distribution ==
This species occurs in the Bahamas.
