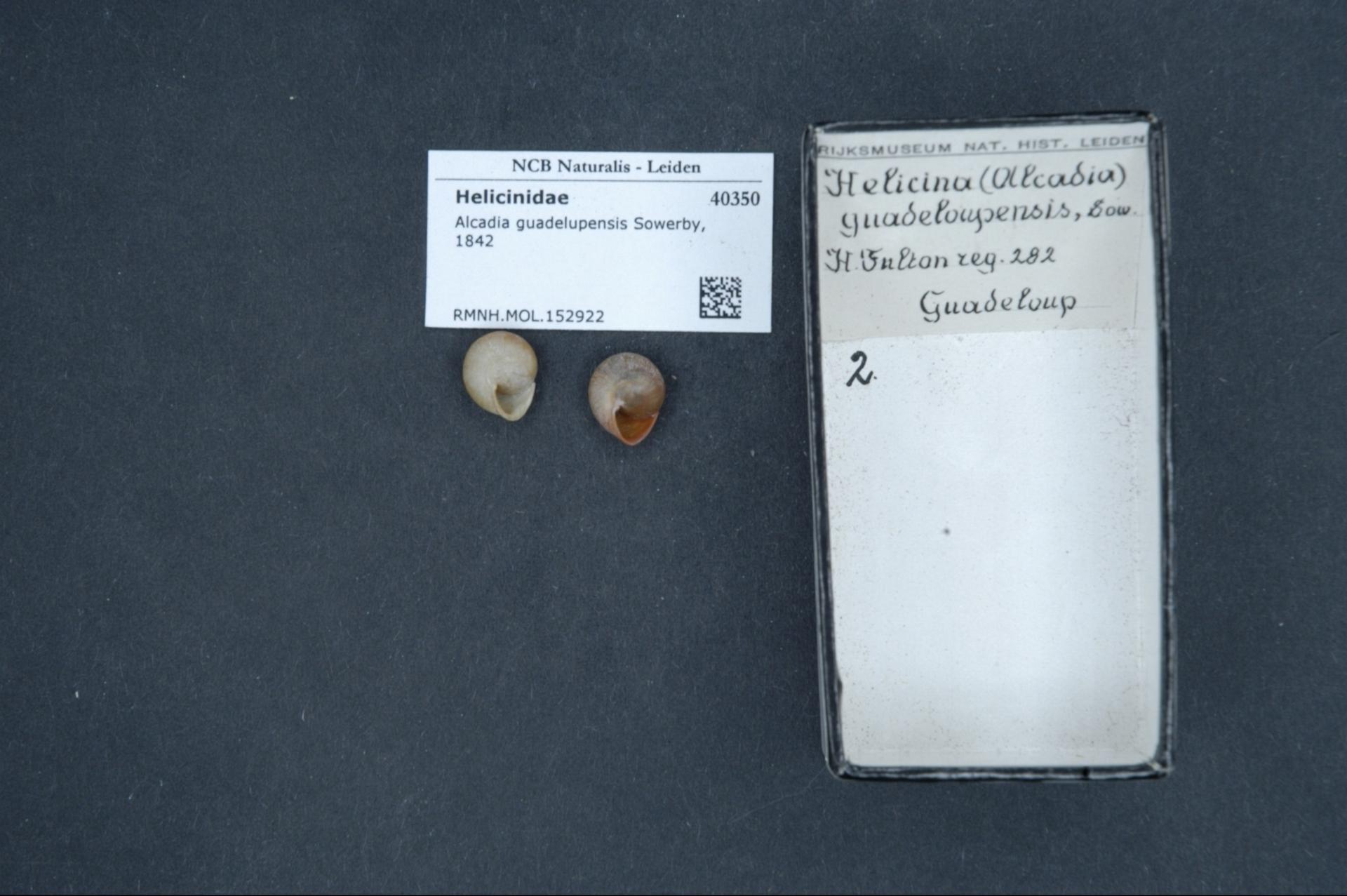
- Shell of Alcadia guadelupensis (specimen at Naturalis Biodiversity Center

Scientific classification
- Kingdom: Animalia
- Phylum: Mollusca
- Class: Gastropoda
- Order: Cycloneritida
- Family: Helicinidae
- Genus: Alcadia
- Species: A. guadaloupensis

Binomial name
- Alcadia guadaloupensis (G. B. Sowerby II, 1842)

Synonyms
- Helicina (Oligyra) guadelupensis [sic] misspelling - incorrect subsequent spelling (unaccepted combination); Helicina guadaloupensis G. B. Sowerby II, 1842 (basionym)

= Alcadia guadaloupensis =

Species of gastropod

Alcadia guadaloupensis is a species of an operculate land snail, terrestrial gastropod mollusk in the family Helicinidae.

== Description ==
(Original description in Latin) The shell is flattened and somewhat angular, showing fine concentric striations. The columella is nodulous at the base. The outer lip is thick and reflexed. The whorls gradually increase in size, and are somewhat swollen above and below. The operculum is brown and horny.

== Distribution ==
This species occurs in Guadeloupe.
