= Alcadia hjalmarsoni =

Scientific classification
- Kingdom: Animalia
- Phylum: Mollusca
- Class: Gastropoda
- Order: Cycloneritida
- Family: Helicinidae
- Genus: Alcadia
- Species: A. hjalmarsoni

Binomial name
- Alcadia hjalmarsoni (L. Pfeiffer, 1856)

Synonyms
- Helicina hjalmarsoni L. Pfeiffer, 1856

Species of gastropod

Alcadia hjalmarsoni is a species of an operculate land snail, terrestrial gastropod mollusk in the family Helicinidae.

== Description ==
The height of the shell attains 5 mm, its greatest diameter 8 mm.

(Original description in Latin) The conoid-depressed shell is somewhat solid, smooth and slightly shiny. It is tawny with a purplish tint near the suture and aperture. The spire is convex and somewhat pointed. There are 4 whorls, which are somewhat flat and gradually increase in size. The body whorl is depressingly rounded with an arched fissure near the columella. The aperture is nearly diagonal and somewhat semi-oval. The columella descends at a right angle from the base, is slightly twisted, and scarcely recedes, emitting a thin, defined callus. The peristome is obtuse and yellow-bordered, with the right margin slightly curved forward. The operculum is thin and tawny.

== Distribution ==
This species occurs in Puerto Rico.
