= Alcadia boeckeleri =

Scientific classification
- Domain: Eukaryota
- Kingdom: Animalia
- Phylum: Mollusca
- Class: Gastropoda
- Subclass: Neritimorpha
- Order: Cycloneritida
- Family: Helicinidae
- Genus: Alcadia
- Species: A. boeckeleri

Binomial name
- Alcadia boeckeleri (Richling, 2001)

Synonyms
- Alcadia (Microalcadia) boeckeleri (Richling, 2001) alternative representation; Helicina boeckeleri Richling, 2001 (original combination)

Species of gastropod

Alcadia boeckeleri is a species of an operculate land snail, terrestrial gastropod mollusk in the family Helicinidae.

== Distribution ==
This species occurs in Costa Rica.
