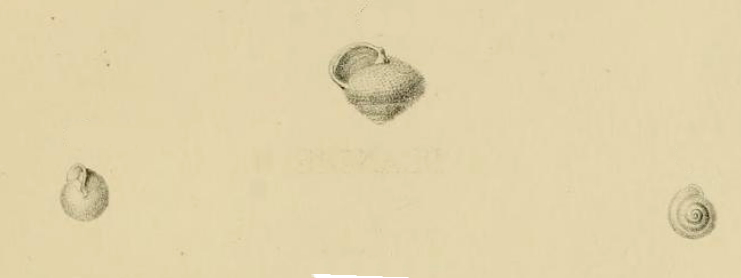
- Shell of Alcadia sericea (holotype)

Scientific classification
- Kingdom: Animalia
- Phylum: Mollusca
- Class: Gastropoda
- Order: Cycloneritida
- Family: Helicinidae
- Genus: Alcadia
- Species: A. sericea

Binomial name
- Alcadia sericea (Drouët, 1859)

Synonyms
- Helicina (Oligyra) sericea Drouët, 1859 superseded combination; Helicina sericea Drouët, 1859 (original combination)

= Alcadia sericea =

Species of gastropod

Alcadia sericea is a species of an operculate land snail, terrestrial gastropod mollusk in the family Helicinidae.

== Description ==
The height of the shell attains 5.5 mm (0.22 in), its greatest diameter 6 mm (0.24 in).

(Original description in Latin) The globular-trochiform shell is thin, smooth and shiny below and slightly striated above. It is somewhat translucent, silky, and horn-reddish. It has 5 whorls, with the body whorl expanded. The aperture is hemispherical, and the peristome is reflexed, either white or pink, and somewhat sinuous at the base. The operculum is solid, somewhat opaque, and gray.

== Distribution ==
This species occurs in French Guiana and Suriname.
