= Alcadia neebiana =

Scientific classification
- Kingdom: Animalia
- Phylum: Mollusca
- Class: Gastropoda
- Order: Cycloneritida
- Family: Helicinidae
- Genus: Alcadia
- Species: A. neebiana

Binomial name
- Alcadia neebiana (L. Pfeiffer, 1862)

Synonyms
- Alcadia (Hjalmarsona) selenipoma Aguayo & Jaume, 1958 (junior synonym); Helicina neebiana L. Pfeiffer, 1862 (original combination)

Species of gastropod

Alcadia neebiana is a species of an operculate land snail, terrestrial gastropod mollusk in the family Helicinidae.

== Description ==
The height of the shell attains 8.2 mm (0.32 in), its greatest diameter 10.7 mm (0.42 in).

== Distribution ==
This species occurs in Cuba.
