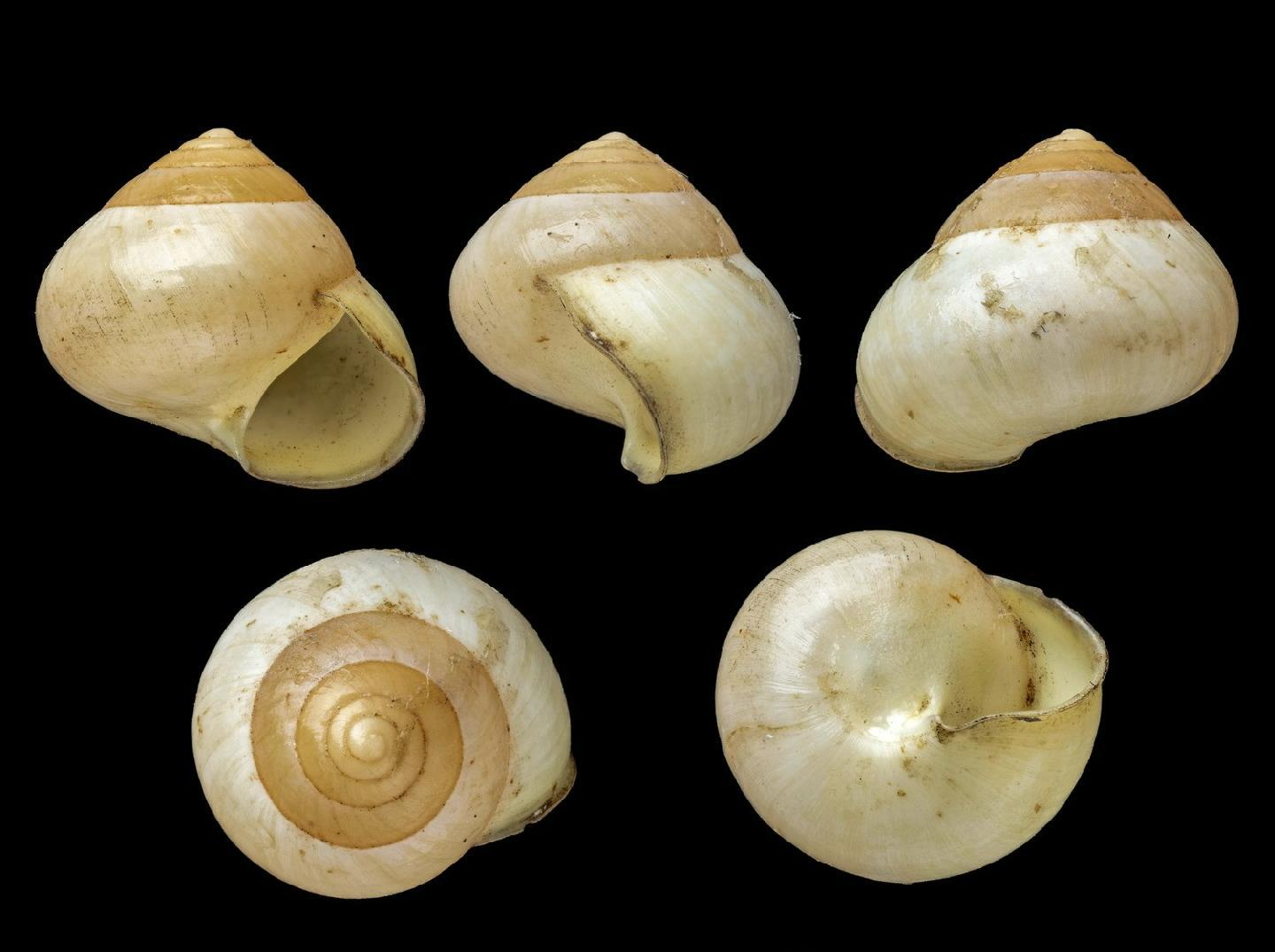
- Shell of Alcadia rotunda (specimen at the Natural History Museum, London)

Scientific classification
- Domain: Eukaryota
- Kingdom: Animalia
- Phylum: Mollusca
- Class: Gastropoda
- Subclass: Neritimorpha
- Order: Cycloneritida
- Family: Helicinidae
- Genus: Alcadia
- Species: A. rotunda

Binomial name
- Alcadia rotunda (A. d'Orbigny, 1842)

Synonyms
- Alcadia (Idesa) rotunda (A. d'Orbigny, 1842) alternative representation; Helicina (Pachystoma) rotunda A. d'Orbigny, 1842 superseded combination; Helicina campanula L. Pfeiffer, 1849 (junior synonym); Helicina retracta Poey, 1852 (junior synonym); Helicina rotunda A. d'Orbigny, 1842 (original combination)

= Alcadia rotunda =

Species of gastropod

Alcadia rotunda is a species of an operculate land snail, terrestrial gastropod mollusk in the family Helicinidae.

== Description ==
The height of the shell attains 7 mm (0.28 in), its greatest diameter 8 mm (0.31 in).

(Original description in Latin) The thick, smooth shell is globular-round and pink. The spire is inflated with a pointed apex. The shell contains six slightly convex whorls. It has a narrow, semi-lunar aperture with a thin, slightly reflexed outer lip. The columella is thickened and has some impressions. The columellar angle of the aperture is notched and sinuous.

(Original description in French also by A. d'Orbigny) A globular, slightly elevated shell that is thick and smooth. The spire is swollen with a slightly pointed apex and consists of six barely convex whorls. The narrow, semi-lunar aperture has thin, sharp, and very slightly reflexed edges. The columella is encrusted over half the width of the aperture and features a strong triangular depression in the middle. At the front, the columellar angle is slightly prominent and separated from the rest of the edge by a slight notch.

== Distribution ==
This species occurs in Cuba.
