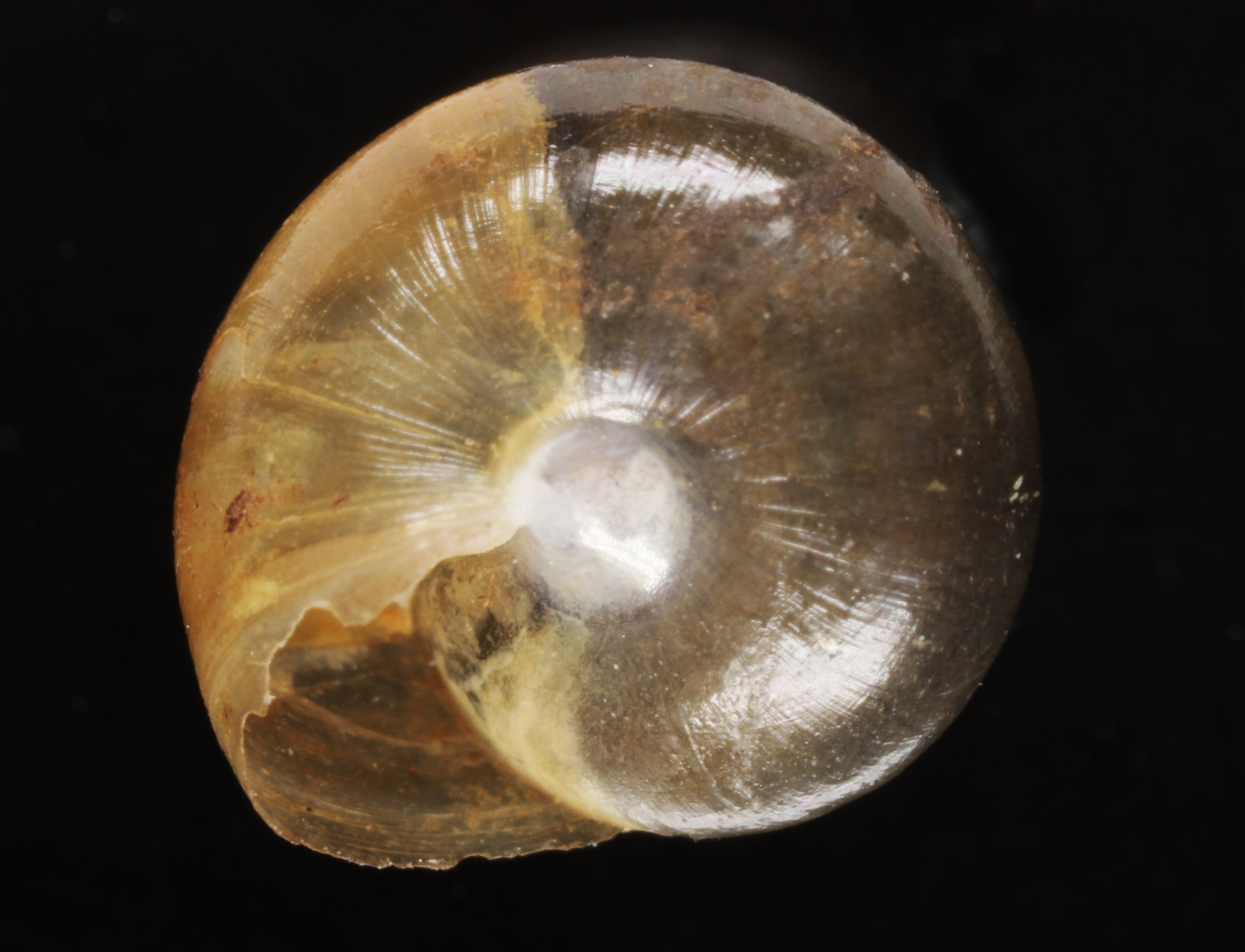
- Shell of Alcadia schrammi (syntype at the MNHN, Paris)

Scientific classification
- Kingdom: Animalia
- Phylum: Mollusca
- Class: Gastropoda
- Order: Cycloneritida
- Family: Helicinidae
- Genus: Alcadia
- Species: A. schrammi

Binomial name
- Alcadia schrammi (Crosse, 1872)

Synonyms
- Alcadia (Idesa) schrammi (Crosse, 1872) (unaccepted combination); Helicina (Schrammia) schrammi Crosse, 1872 superseded combination; Helicina schrammi Crosse, 1872 (original combination); Schrammia schrammi (Crosse, 1872) (unaccepted combination)

= Alcadia schrammi =

Species of gastropod

Alcadia schrammi is a species of an operculate land snail, terrestrial gastropod mollusk in the family Helicinidae.

== Description ==
The height of the shell attains 5 mm (0.20 in), its greatest diameter 5.67 mm (0.22 in).

(Original description in Latin) The turbinated-conical shell shows minute growth striae. It is thin and scarcely conspicuously impressed. It is translucent, somewhat shiny, horn-colored and unicolored. The spire is moderately elevated, with a somewhat sharp apex. The suture is impressed. the shell contains 5 slightly flat whorls, the body whorl scarcely surpassing the spire. The whorls are obtusely subcarinate at the periphery and somewhat flat at the base. The columella is short, emitting a small, milky callus. The aperture is oblique, somewhat triangular and is horn-colored on the inside. The peristome is simple, with thin, fragile, sharp basal and outer margins. The thin operculum is horn-colored.

== Distribution ==
This species occurs in Guadeloupe.
