= Alcadia rhamphostyla =

Scientific classification
- Kingdom: Animalia
- Phylum: Mollusca
- Class: Gastropoda
- Order: Cycloneritida
- Family: Helicinidae
- Genus: Alcadia
- Species: A. rhamphostyla

Binomial name
- Alcadia rhamphostyla (Pfeiffer, 1857)

Synonyms
- Helicina (Alcadia) rhamphostyla L. Pfeiffer, 1857 (original combination)

Species of gastropod

Alcadia rhamphostyla is a species of an operculate land snail, terrestrial gastropod mollusk in the family Helicinidae.

== Description ==
The height of the shell attains 12 mm, its greatest diameter 15.5 mm.

(Original description in Latin) The shell has a conoidal-globose shape. It is solid and somewhat smooth, its color is whitish or yellowish. The spire is shortly conoidal and somewhat obtuse and contains 4.5 whorls. The upper whorls are barely convex, and the body whorl is large and rounded. The columella is broad, expanding above into a thick, semicircular callus and curving to the right at the base. The aperture is oblique and somewhat semicircular. The peristome is expanded and thin, calloused inside, with the right margin somewhat spreading. The basal margin is separated from the rostriform end of the columella by a deep sinus and is further provided with a fold entering behind the columella.

== Distribution ==
This species lives in Cuba.
