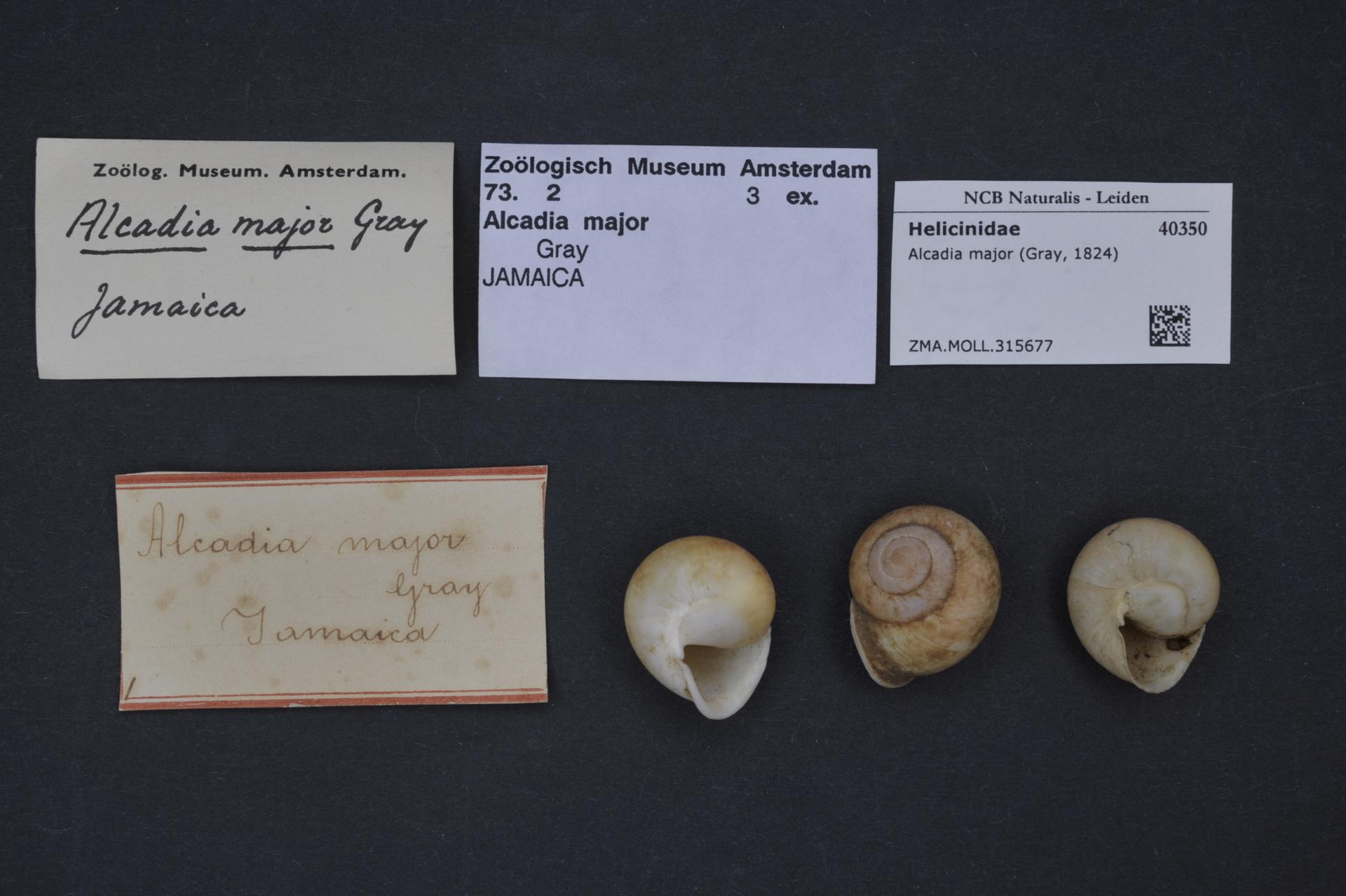
- Shell of Alcadia major (specimen at Naturalis Biodiversity Center)

Scientific classification
- Kingdom: Animalia
- Phylum: Mollusca
- Class: Gastropoda
- Order: Cycloneritida
- Family: Helicinidae
- Genus: Alcadia
- Species: A. major

Binomial name
- Alcadia major (J. E. Gray, 1824)

Synonyms
- Alcadia (Alcadia) major (J. E. Gray, 1824) · alternative representation; Helicina (Alcadia) major J. E. Gray, 1824 superseded combination; Helicina major J. E. Gray, 1824 (basionym)

= Alcadia major =

Species of gastropod

Alcadia major is a species of an operculate land snail, terrestrial gastropod mollusk in the family Helicinidae.

Subspecies

- Alcadia major gossei (L. Pfeiffer, 1849)
- Alcadia major major (J. E. Gray, 1824)

== Description ==
(Original description) The shell is depressed ovate and nearly globular, with a smooth, brownish surface. The spire is convex and has a purplish hue on the upper part, while the front is rather convex and pale. The peristome is thickened, white, and reflected, featuring a slight blunt notch near the columellar angle. The inner lip is thickened, convex, and pale.

== Distribution ==
This species occurs on Jamaica.
