= Alcadia charmosyne =

Scientific classification
- Kingdom: Animalia
- Phylum: Mollusca
- Class: Gastropoda
- Order: Cycloneritida
- Family: Helicinidae
- Genus: Alcadia
- Species: A. charmosyne

Binomial name
- Alcadia charmosyne (Pilsbry, 1933)

Synonyms
- Alcadia (Idesa) charmosyne Pilsbry, 1933; Helicina charmosyne Pilsbry, 1933 ·

Species of gastropod

Alcadia charmosyne is a species of an operculate land snail, terrestrial gastropod mollusk in the family Helicinidae.

== Distribution ==
This species occurs in Dominican Republic.
