= Alcadia alta =

Scientific classification
- Kingdom: Animalia
- Phylum: Mollusca
- Class: Gastropoda
- Order: Cycloneritida
- Family: Helicinidae
- Genus: Alcadia
- Species: A. alta

Binomial name
- Alcadia alta (G. B. Sowerby II, 1866)

Synonyms
- Helicina alta G. B. Sowerby II, 1866 (basionym)

Species of gastropod

Alcadia alta is a species of an operculate land snail, terrestrial gastropod mollusk in the family Helicinidae.

== Description ==
(Original description) This species is small and pellucidid.

The height of the shell attains 5.3 mm.

== Distribution ==
This species occurs on Puerto Rico.
