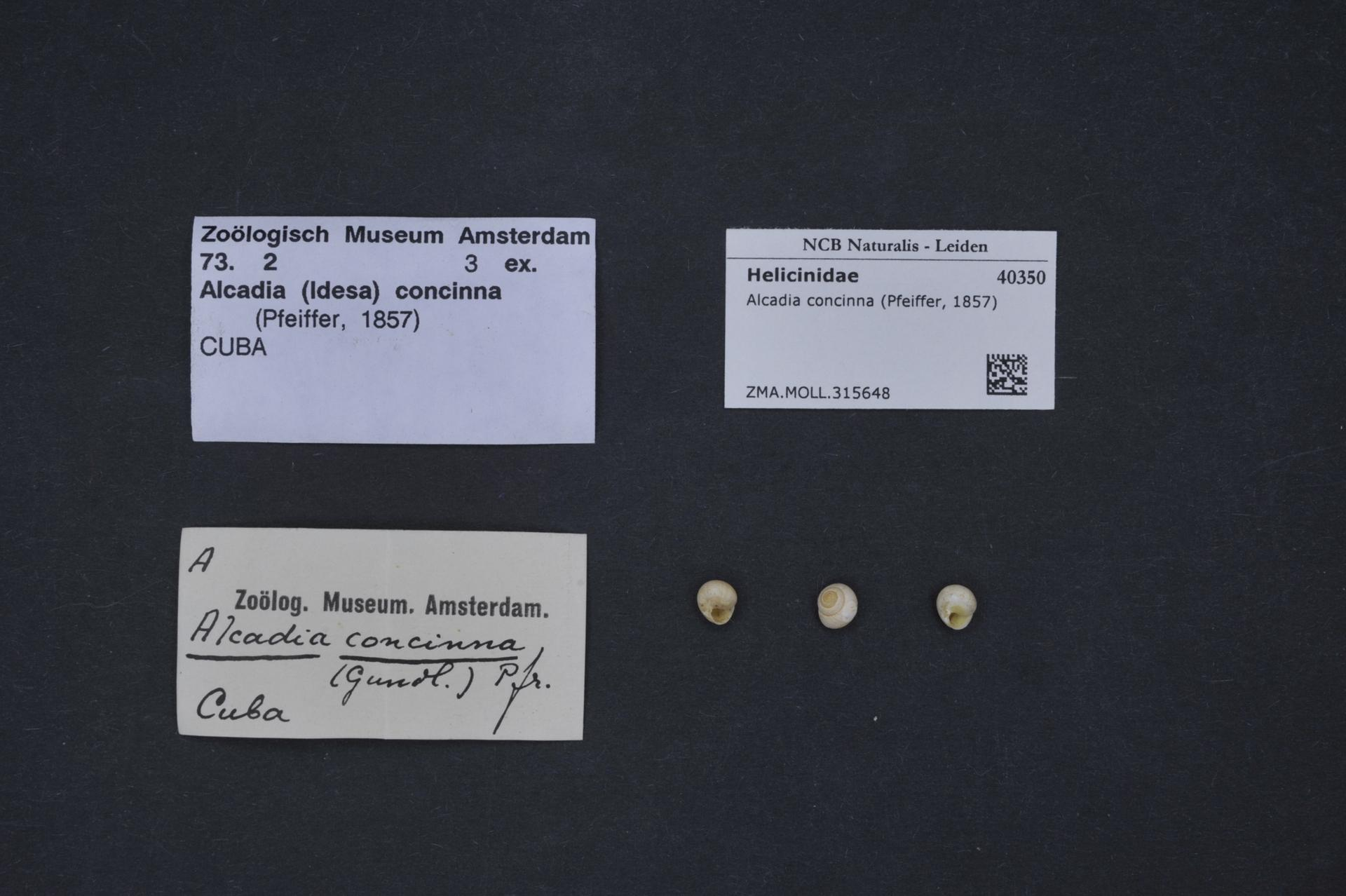
- Shell of Alcadia concinna (specimen in Naturalis Biodiversity Center)

Scientific classification
- Kingdom: Animalia
- Phylum: Mollusca
- Class: Gastropoda
- Order: Cycloneritida
- Family: Helicinidae
- Genus: Alcadia
- Species: A. concinna

Binomial name
- Alcadia concinna (L. Pfeiffer, 1857)

Synonyms
- Alcadia (Idesa) concinna (L. Pfeiffer, 1857) · alternative representation; Helicina concinna L. Pfeiffer, 1857 · unaccepted (original combination); Helicina exserta L. Pfeiffer, 1858 ·

= Alcadia concinna =

Species of gastropod

Alcadia concinna is a species of an operculate land snail, terrestrial gastropod mollusk in the family Helicinidae.

== Description ==
The height of the shell attains four mm, its greatest diameter six mm.

(Original description in Latin) The solid shell is conical-globose and smooth, exhibiting a white or pale pink coloration, often adorned with one or two red bands. The spire is convex-conoid, while the apex is yellow or fiery and mucronulate. The shell comprises 5.5 flat whorls, with the body whorl being inflated, briefly deflected anteriorly, and underconstricted. The columella is short and features a wide yellow-orange vein terminating in a sharp denticle. The aperture is oblique, broadly semi-oval, and bright yellow or igneous inside. The peristome is slightly expanded, with a curved basal margin and a slight sinus separated from the columella denticle. The operculum is dipped, scaly, and pale.

== Distribution ==
This species occurs in Cuba.
