= Alcadia delmonteana =

Scientific classification
- Kingdom: Animalia
- Phylum: Mollusca
- Class: Gastropoda
- Order: Cycloneritida
- Family: Helicinidae
- Genus: Alcadia
- Species: A. delmonteana

Binomial name
- Alcadia delmonteana Pilsbry, 1933

Species of gastropod

Alcadia delmonteana is a species of an operculate land snail, terrestrial gastropod mollusk in the family Helicinidae.

== Distribution ==
This species occurs in Dominican Republic.
