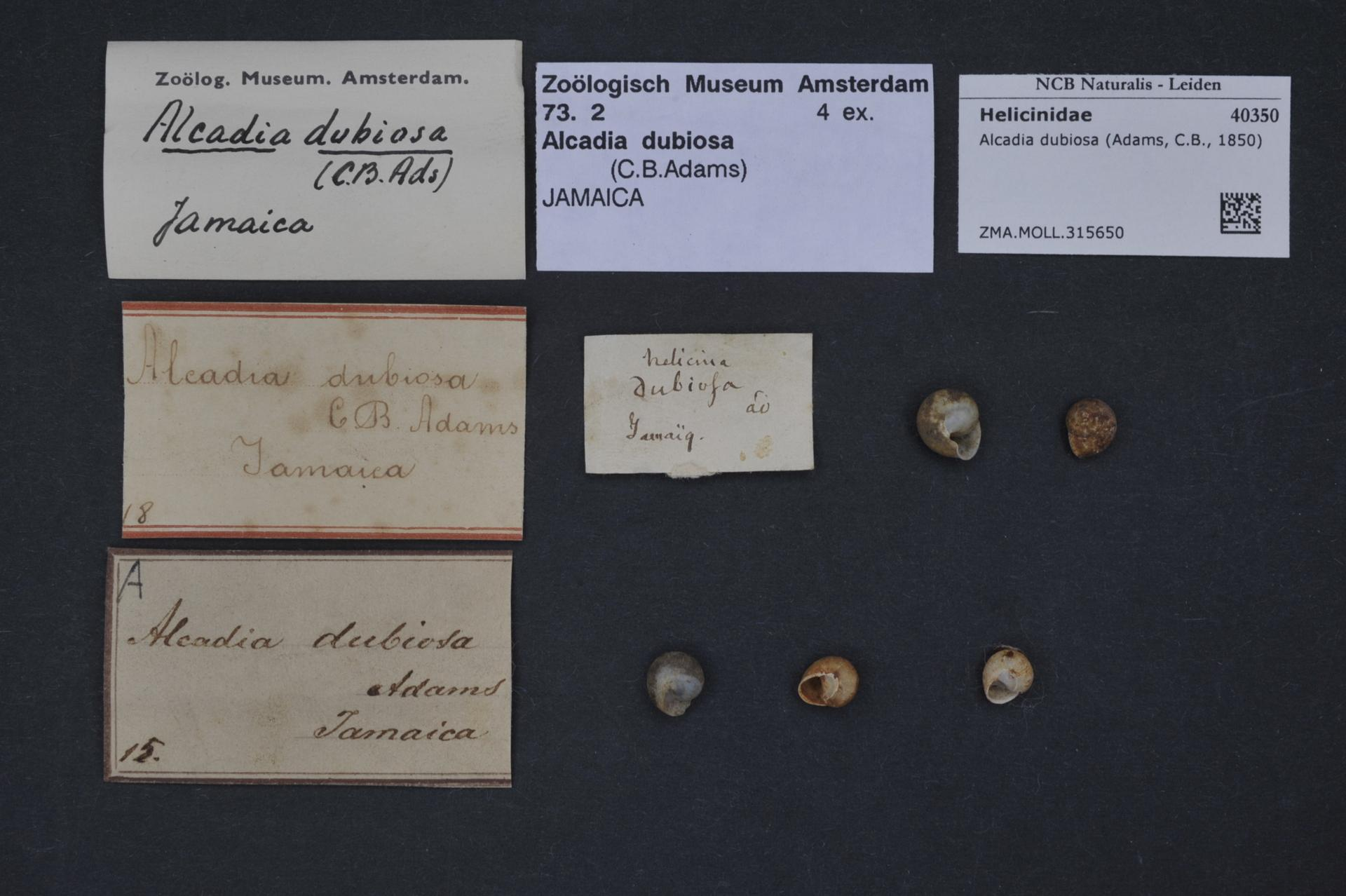
- Shell of Alcadia dubiosa (specimen at Naturalis Biodiversity Center)

Scientific classification
- Kingdom: Animalia
- Phylum: Mollusca
- Class: Gastropoda
- Order: Cycloneritida
- Family: Helicinidae
- Genus: Alcadia
- Species: A. dubiosa

Binomial name
- Alcadia dubiosa (C. B. Adams, 1850)

Synonyms
- Alcadia (Hjalmarsona) dubiosa (C. B. Adams, 1850) alternative representation; Helicina (Oligyra) dubiosa (C. B. Adams, 1850) superseded combination; Helicina dubiosa C. B. Adams, 1850 (original combination); Helicina dubiosa var. intermedia C. B. Adams, 1850 (variety)

= Alcadia dubiosa =

Species of gastropod

Alcadia dubiosa is a species of an operculate land snail, terrestrial gastropod mollusk in the family Helicinidae.

== Description ==
The greatest diameter of the shell attains 7.6 mm.

(Original description) The shell is globose-conic and shining, with a reddish-brown coloration. The outer lip and callus are yellowish-white. It features extremely fine growth striae and very lightly impressed microscopic spiral striae. The apex is subacute, and the spire is well elevated with slightly convex outlines. The shell consists of four and a half rather convex whorls with a well-impressed suture. The aperture is rather large and semicircular, with a barely perceptible or absent notch at the base of the columella. The outer lip is moderately reflected and thickened.

== Distribution ==
This species occurs in Jamaica.
