= Alcadia nodulosa =

Scientific classification
- Kingdom: Animalia
- Phylum: Mollusca
- Class: Gastropoda
- Order: Cycloneritida
- Family: Helicinidae
- Genus: Alcadia
- Species: A. nodulosa

Binomial name
- Alcadia nodulosa Hausdorf, 2006

Synonyms
- Alcadia (Microalcadia) nodulosa Hausdorf, 2006 · alternative representation

Species of gastropod

Alcadia nodulosa is a species of an operculate land snail, terrestrial gastropod mollusk in the family Helicinidae.

== Distribution ==
This species occurs in Colombia.
