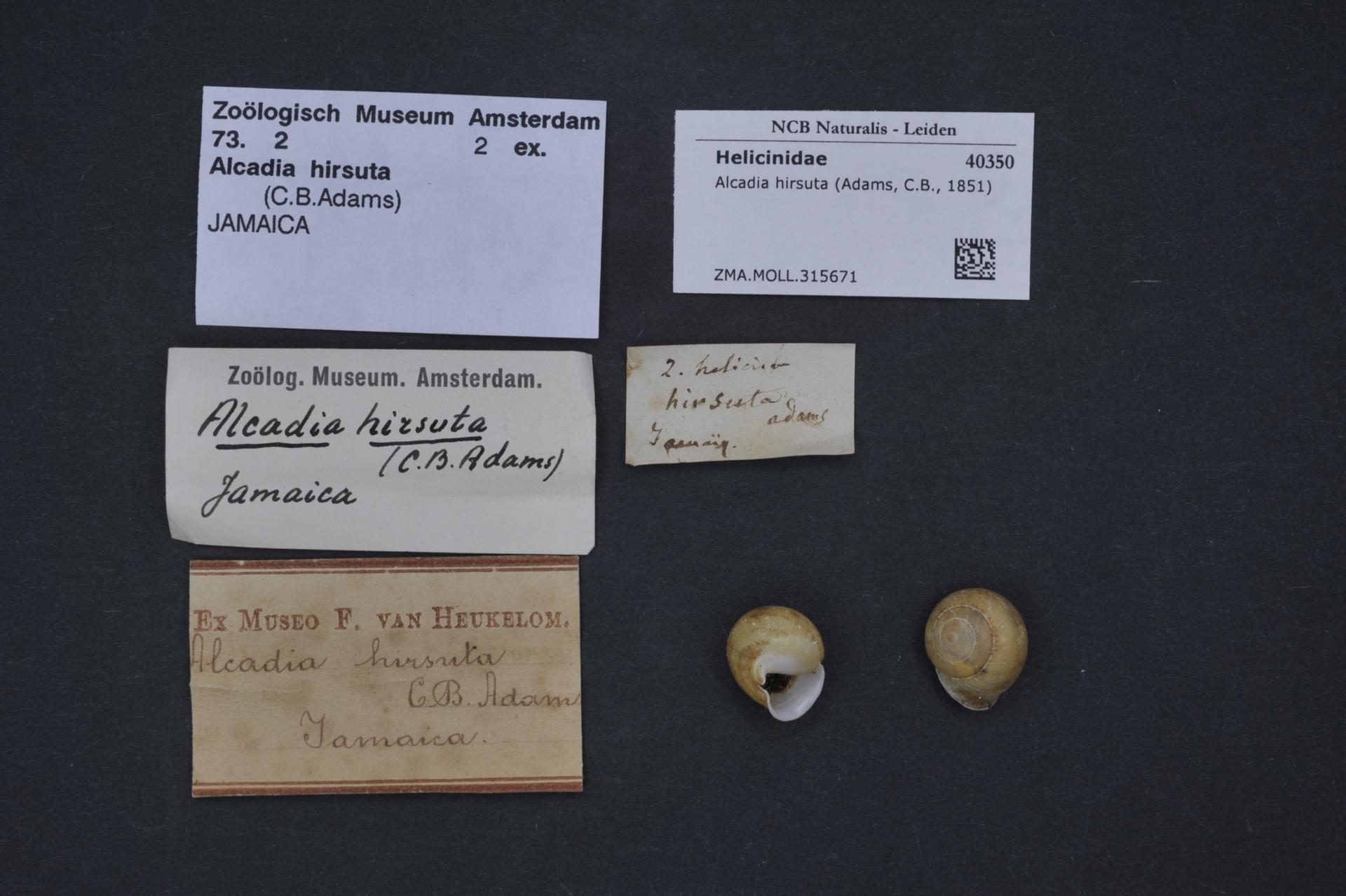
- Shell of Alcadia hirsuta (specimen at Naturalis Biodiversity Center)

Scientific classification
- Kingdom: Animalia
- Phylum: Mollusca
- Class: Gastropoda
- Order: Cycloneritida
- Family: Helicinidae
- Genus: Alcadia
- Species: A. hirsuta

Binomial name
- Alcadia hirsuta (C. B. Adams, 1851)

Synonyms
- Alcadia (Palliata) hirsuta (C. B. Adams, 1851) · alternative representation; Helicina hirsuta C. B. Adams, 1851 (original combination)

= Alcadia hirsuta =

Species of gastropod

Alcadia hirsuta is a species of an operculate land snail, terrestrial gastropod mollusk in the family Helicinidae.

== Description ==
(Original description) The shell is depressed globose and rather thin, exhibiting a brownish-red color with a hirsute brown epidermis. It has long hairs arranged in six spiral lines, with one line just below the suture and the others on the middle and lower parts of the body whorl. The growth striae are lightly impressed. The apex is rather obtuse and slightly mucronate, while the spire has notably curved outlines. The shell consists of nearly five slightly planulate whorls with a well-impressed suture. The aperture is rather large and semi-elliptical. The louter lip is rather thin and sharp but well reflected, forming a siphonal canal behind it. The slit is wide but not very deep.

== Distribution ==
This species occurs in Jamaica.
