= Alcadia chocoensis =

Scientific classification
- Domain: Eukaryota
- Kingdom: Animalia
- Phylum: Mollusca
- Class: Gastropoda
- Subclass: Neritimorpha
- Order: Cycloneritida
- Family: Helicinidae
- Genus: Alcadia
- Species: A. chocoensis

Binomial name
- Alcadia chocoensis Roosen, 2023

Synonyms
- Alcadia (Microalcadia) chocoensis Roosen, 2023 alternative representation

Species of gastropod

Alcadia chocoensis is a species of an operculate land snail, terrestrial gastropod mollusk in the family Helicinidae.

== Description ==
The height of the shell varies between 3.1 mm and 4.1 mm; its diameter between 3.3 mm and 4.2 mm.

== Distribution ==
This species occurs in Ecuador.
