= Alcadia citrinolabris =

Scientific classification
- Kingdom: Animalia
- Phylum: Mollusca
- Class: Gastropoda
- Order: Cycloneritida
- Family: Helicinidae
- Genus: Alcadia
- Species: A. citrinolabris

Binomial name
- Alcadia citrinolabris (C. B. Adams, 1849)

Synonyms
- Alcadia (Alcadia) citrinolabris (C. B. Adams, 1849) alternative representation; Helicina (Alcadia) palliata var. citrinolabris C. B. Adams, 1849 superseded combination; Helicina albolabris C. B. Adams, 1849 (junior homonym of Helicina albolabris Hombron & Jacquinot, 1848); Helicina citrinolabris C. B. Adams, 1849 (original combination)

Species of gastropod

Alcadia citrinolabris is a species of an operculate land snail, terrestrial gastropod mollusk in the family Helicinidae.

== Description ==
The height of the shell attains 4 mm, its greatest diameter 6 mm.

(Original description) The shell is brown or lemon yellow, very solid, with an outer lip that is exceptionally thick and always lemon yellow. In other characteristics, it resembles Helicina albolabris, potentially representing a variety with greater divergence. The epidermis is very finely, but not densely hirsute.

== Distribution ==
This species occurs in Jamaica.
