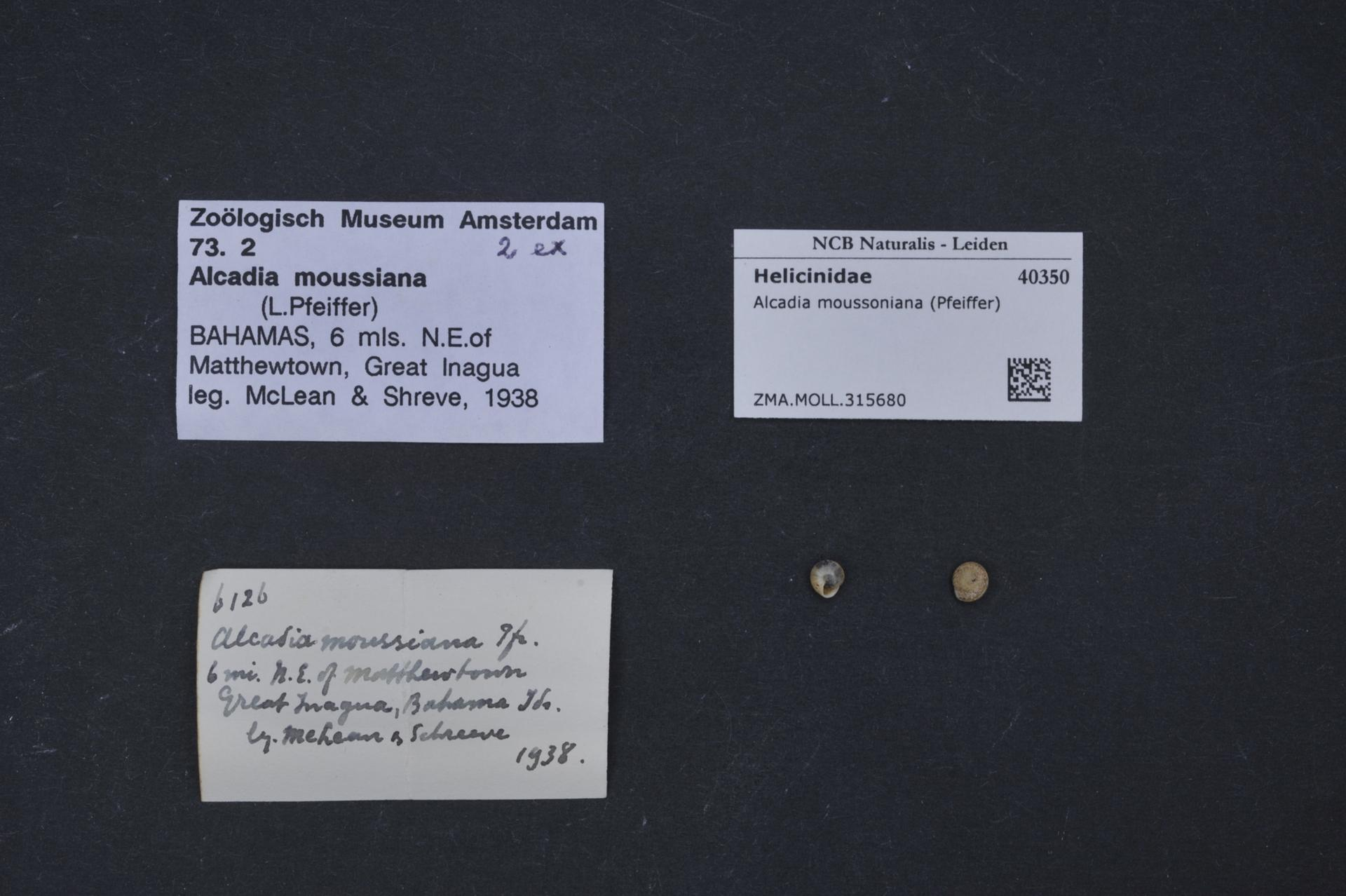
- Shell of Alcadia moussoniana (specimen at Naturalis Biodiversity Center)

Scientific classification
- Kingdom: Animalia
- Phylum: Mollusca
- Class: Gastropoda
- Order: Cycloneritida
- Family: Helicinidae
- Genus: Alcadia
- Species: A. moussoniana

Binomial name
- Alcadia moussoniana (L. Pfeiffer, 1866)

Synonyms
- Alcadia (Analcadia) moussoniana (L. Pfeiffer, 1866) alternative representation; Helicina (Oligyra) moussoniana L. Pfeiffer, 1866 alternative representation; Helicina moussoniana L. Pfeiffer, 1866 (original combination)

= Alcadia moussoniana =

Species of gastropod

Alcadia moussoniana is a species of an operculate land snail, terrestrial gastropod mollusk in the family Helicinidae.

== Distribution ==
This species occurs in the Bahamas.
