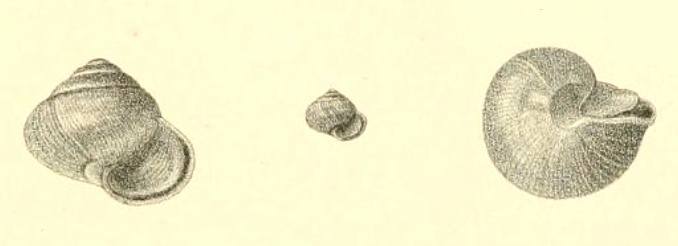
- Shell of Alcadia kuehni (holotype)

Scientific classification
- Kingdom: Animalia
- Phylum: Mollusca
- Class: Gastropoda
- Order: Cycloneritida
- Family: Helicinidae
- Genus: Alcadia
- Species: A. kuehni

Binomial name
- Alcadia kuehni (L. Pfeiffer, 1872)

Synonyms
- Alcadia sericea var. kuehni (L. Pfeiffer, 1872) (variety); Helicina kuehni L. Pfeiffer, 1872 (original combination)

= Alcadia kuehni =

Species of gastropod

Alcadia kuehni is a species of an operculate land snail, terrestrial gastropod mollusk in the family Helicinidae.

== Description ==
The height of the shell attains 4 mm, its greatest diameter 5.7 mm.

(Original description in Latin) The globose-conical shell is thin and very finely striated. It is somewhat smooth, shiny, translucent and reddish-amber. The spire is conical, the apex somewhat pointed and the suture impressed. The shell contains 5 whorls. These are scarcely convex with the body whorl nearly equaling the spire and is more globose. The basal callus is thinand diffuse. The aperture is diagonal and somewhat triangular semi-oval. The white peristome is scarcely thickened with the right margin narrowly expanded, basal margin slightly reflexed, somewhat dilated outward, forming a short, obscure denticle at the junction with the very short columella. The thin operculum is of the same color.

== Distribution ==
This species occurs in French Guiana and Suriname.
