= Alcadia megastoma =

Scientific classification
- Kingdom: Animalia
- Phylum: Mollusca
- Class: Gastropoda
- Order: Cycloneritida
- Family: Helicinidae
- Genus: Alcadia
- Species: A. megastoma

Binomial name
- Alcadia megastoma (C. B. Adams, 1849)

Synonyms
- Alcadia (Hjalmarsona) megastoma (C. B. Adams, 1849) alternative representation; Helicina (Oligyra) megastoma C. B. Adams, 1849 superseded combination; Helicina megastoma C. B. Adams, 1849 (original combination)

Species of gastropod

Alcadia megastoma is a species of an operculate land snail, terrestrial gastropod mollusk in the family Helicinidae.

== Description ==
(Original description) The shell is globose-conic, smooth, and shiny, with a rather thick yellowish-brown exterior. The spire has very convex outlines and consists of four and a half slightly flattened whorls. The body whorl is very large and high, resulting in a proportionally large, semicircular aperture. The outer lip is moderately reflected and thickened. The columella and the adjacent part of the body whorl are bent into the plane of the aperture, with the columella forming a very minute tubercle.

== Distribution ==
This species occurs in Jamaica.
