= Alcadia pompholyx =

Scientific classification
- Kingdom: Animalia
- Phylum: Mollusca
- Class: Gastropoda
- Order: Cycloneritida
- Family: Helicinidae
- Genus: Alcadia
- Species: A. pompholyx

Binomial name
- Alcadia pompholyx (Pilsbry, 1933)

Synonyms
- Alcadia (Idesa) pompholyx (Pilsbry, 1933); Helicina pompholyx Pilsbry, 1933 ·

Species of gastropod

Alcadia pompholyx is a species of an operculate land snail, terrestrial gastropod mollusk in the family Helicinidae.

== Distribution ==
This species occurs in Dominican Republic.
