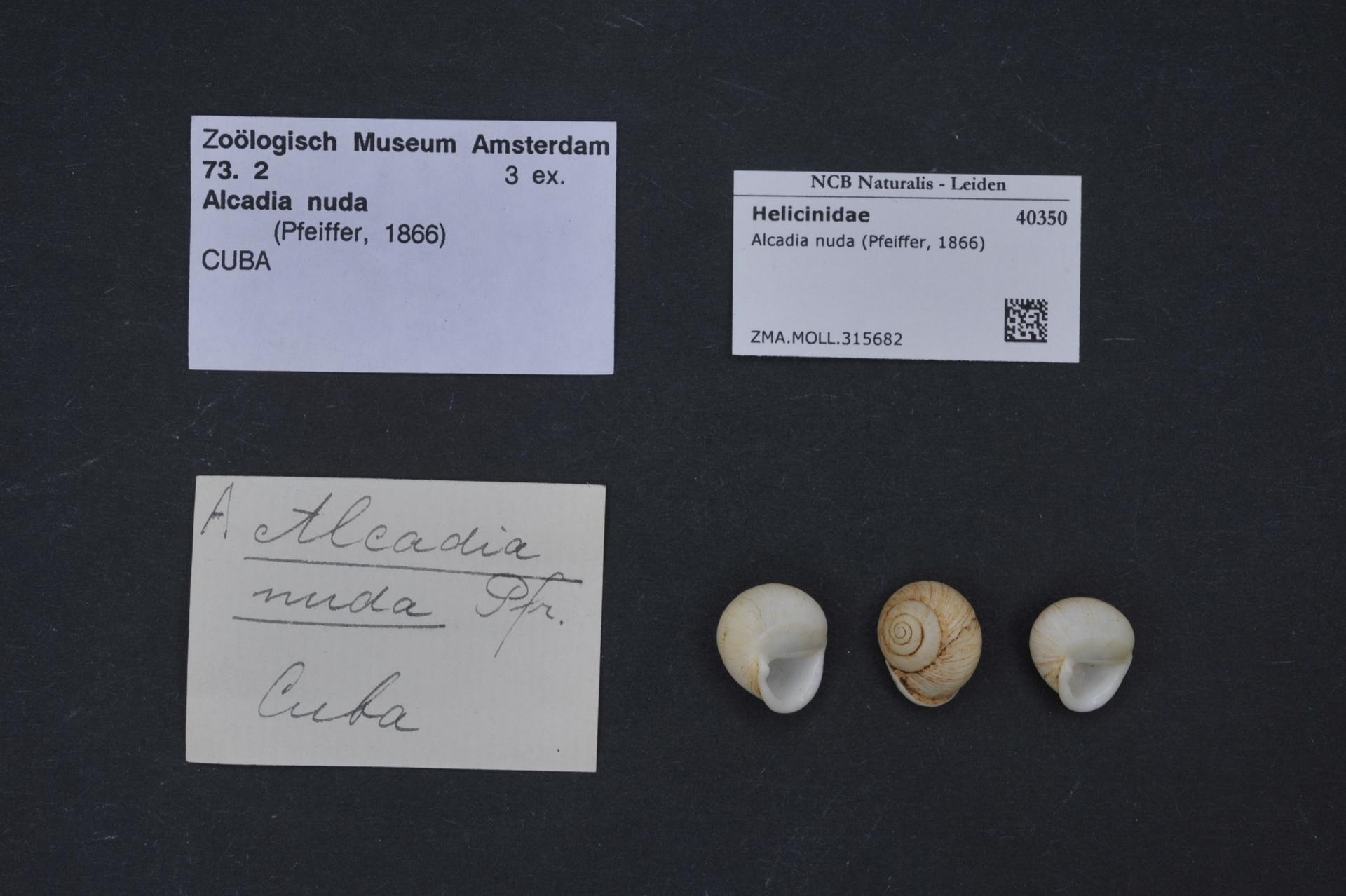
- Shell of Alcadia nuda (specimen at Naturalis Biodiversity Center)

Scientific classification
- Kingdom: Animalia
- Phylum: Mollusca
- Class: Gastropoda
- Order: Cycloneritida
- Family: Helicinidae
- Genus: Alcadia
- Species: A. nuda

Binomial name
- Alcadia nuda (L. Pfeiffer, 1866)

Synonyms
- Alcadia (Alcadia) nuda (L. Pfeiffer, 1866) alternative representation; Helicina (Isoltia) nuda L. Pfeiffer, 1866 superseded combination; Helicina nuda L. Pfeiffer, 1866 (original combination)

= Alcadia nuda =

Species of gastropod

Alcadia nuda is a species of an operculate land snail, terrestrial gastropod mollusk in the family Helicinidae.

Subspecies

- Alcadia nuda bagaensis Aguayo, 1953
- Alcadia nuda nuda (L. Pfeiffer, 1866)

== Distribution ==
This species occurs in Cuba.
