= Alcadia gonostoma =

Scientific classification
- Domain: Eukaryota
- Kingdom: Animalia
- Phylum: Mollusca
- Class: Gastropoda
- Subclass: Neritimorpha
- Order: Cycloneritida
- Family: Helicinidae
- Genus: Alcadia
- Species: A. gonostoma

Binomial name
- Alcadia gonostoma (Poey, 1858)

Synonyms
- Helicina gonostoma Poey, 1858

Species of gastropod

Alcadia gonostoma is a species of an operculate land snail, terrestrial gastropod mollusk in the family Helicinidae.

== Distribution ==
This species occurs in Cuba.
