= Alcadia euglypta =

Scientific classification
- Kingdom: Animalia
- Phylum: Mollusca
- Class: Gastropoda
- Order: Cycloneritida
- Family: Helicinidae
- Genus: Alcadia
- Species: A. euglypta

Binomial name
- Alcadia euglypta Clench & Aguayo, 1950

Synonyms
- Alcadia (Glyptalcadia) euglypta Clench & Aguayo, 1950 · alternative representation

Species of gastropod

Alcadia euglypta is a minute species of operculate land snail in the family Helicinidae. The species is endemic to eastern Cuba and was first described by Clench & Aguayo in 1950.

== Taxonomic placement ==
The ordinal and familial placement of A. euglypta follow the modern neritimorph classification summarised by Richling (2004).

== Description ==
Boss & Jacobson (1973) give the following diagnostic characters:

- Shell depressed-trochiform, thin and translucent, glossy horn-coloured to pale straw.
- Height up to 3.5 mm; maximum diameter 5.5 mm.
- 5–5½ slightly convex whorls with fine incremental striae and faint spiral microsculpture; a weak peripheral angulation may be present.
- Spire low; apex obtuse.
- Aperture oblique, broadly semicircular; peristome thin, not markedly expanded.
- Columellar callus thin, not dentate; umbilicus covered.
- Operculum multispiral, calcareous.

== Distribution and habitat ==
The type locality lies in the Sierra Maestra (then Oriente Province, now Santiago de Cuba/Granma provinces), eastern Cuba. Subsequent records are confined to montane limestone outcrops in the same region.

== Conservation status ==
As of September 2025 the species has not been assessed by the IUCN Red List. Given its narrow range and the continuing loss of native forest in eastern Cuba, Boss & Jacobson (1973) considered the taxon “potentially vulnerable,” but no quantitative data exist.
