= Alcadia rufa =

Scientific classification
- Kingdom: Animalia
- Phylum: Mollusca
- Class: Gastropoda
- Order: Cycloneritida
- Family: Helicinidae
- Genus: Alcadia
- Species: A. rufa

Binomial name
- Alcadia rufa (Pfeiffer, 1857)

Synonyms
- Helicina rufa L. Pfeiffer, 1857 (original combination)

Species of gastropod

Alcadia rufa is a species of an operculate land snail, terrestrial gastropod mollusk belonging to the Helicinidae family.

Subspecies

- Alcadia rufa rufa (L. Pfeiffer, 1857)
- Alcadia rufa salleana (L. Pfeiffer, 1854)

== Description ==
The height of the shell attains 6.7 mm, its greatest diameter 13 mm.

(Original description in Latin) The shell has a somewhat conoidal-depressed shape. It is moderately solid, slightly wrinkled-striated and punctuated, shiny, and reddish. The spire is somewhat conoidal-convex with a fine apex. The shell consists of 4 whorls. The upper whorls are rather flat, while the body whorl is broad, depressed, and somewhat rounded at the periphery. The aperture is diagonal and broadly semi-oval. The columella descends vertically from the penultimate whorl, is slightly curved, and ends anteriorly in a tubercle, emitting a somewhat granular, circumscribed basal callus. The peristome is shortly expanded with a white border. The operculum is of the same color.

== Distribution ==
This species lives in Haiti.
