= Alcadia exigua =

Scientific classification
- Kingdom: Animalia
- Phylum: Mollusca
- Class: Gastropoda
- Order: Cycloneritida
- Family: Helicinidae
- Genus: Alcadia
- Species: A. exigua

Binomial name
- Alcadia exigua (L. Pfeiffer, 1849)

Synonyms
- Alcadia (Microalcadia) exigua (L. Pfeiffer, 1849) · alternative representation; Helicina exigua L. Pfeiffer, 1849 (original combination; junior homonym of Helicina exigua Hombron & Jacquinot, 1848)

Species of gastropod

Alcadia exigua is a species of an operculate land snail, terrestrial gastropod mollusk in the family Helicinidae.

== Description ==
The height of the shell attains 2 mm, its greatest diameter 2.5 mm. Alcadia exigua is a type of land snail, and it is part of a diverse genus of operculate land snails. The name "exigua," meaning "small" or "slender," appears in the scientific names of many different species, including plants, moths, and snails. Therefore, the name Alcadia exigua refers specifically to a land snail from the Helicinidae family.

== Distribution ==
This species occurs in Honduras.
