= Alcadia mammilla =

Scientific classification
- Domain: Eukaryota
- Kingdom: Animalia
- Phylum: Mollusca
- Class: Gastropoda
- Subclass: Neritimorpha
- Order: Cycloneritida
- Family: Helicinidae
- Genus: Alcadia
- Species: A. mammilla

Binomial name
- Alcadia mammilla Weinland, 1862

Synonyms
- Alcadia (Mamilla) mammilla Weinland, 1862 alternative representation; Alcadia (Weinlandella) mammilla Weinland, 1862 ·

Species of gastropod

Alcadia mammilla is a species of an operculate land snail, terrestrial gastropod mollusk in the family Helicinidae.

== Description ==
The height of the shell attains 6.5 mm (0.26 in), its greatest diameter 7.5 mm (0.30 in).

(Original description in Latin) The conical shell is rather solid and slightly striated. it is scarcely shiny, with various marbling and banding in whitish and reddish hues. The spire has a convex-conical shape, ending in a pale apex. There are 5 somewhat convex whorls, with the body whorl deflected at the front and slightly flattened at the base. The columella is short and thread-like, ending at the base with a small denticle and emitting a thin callus. The aperture is oblique and somewhat triangular-semioval. The peristome is thin, with the right margin simple at the top, then dilated and expanded, featuring a distinct sinus at the base separated from the columellar tooth.

== Distribution ==
This species occurs in the Haiti.
