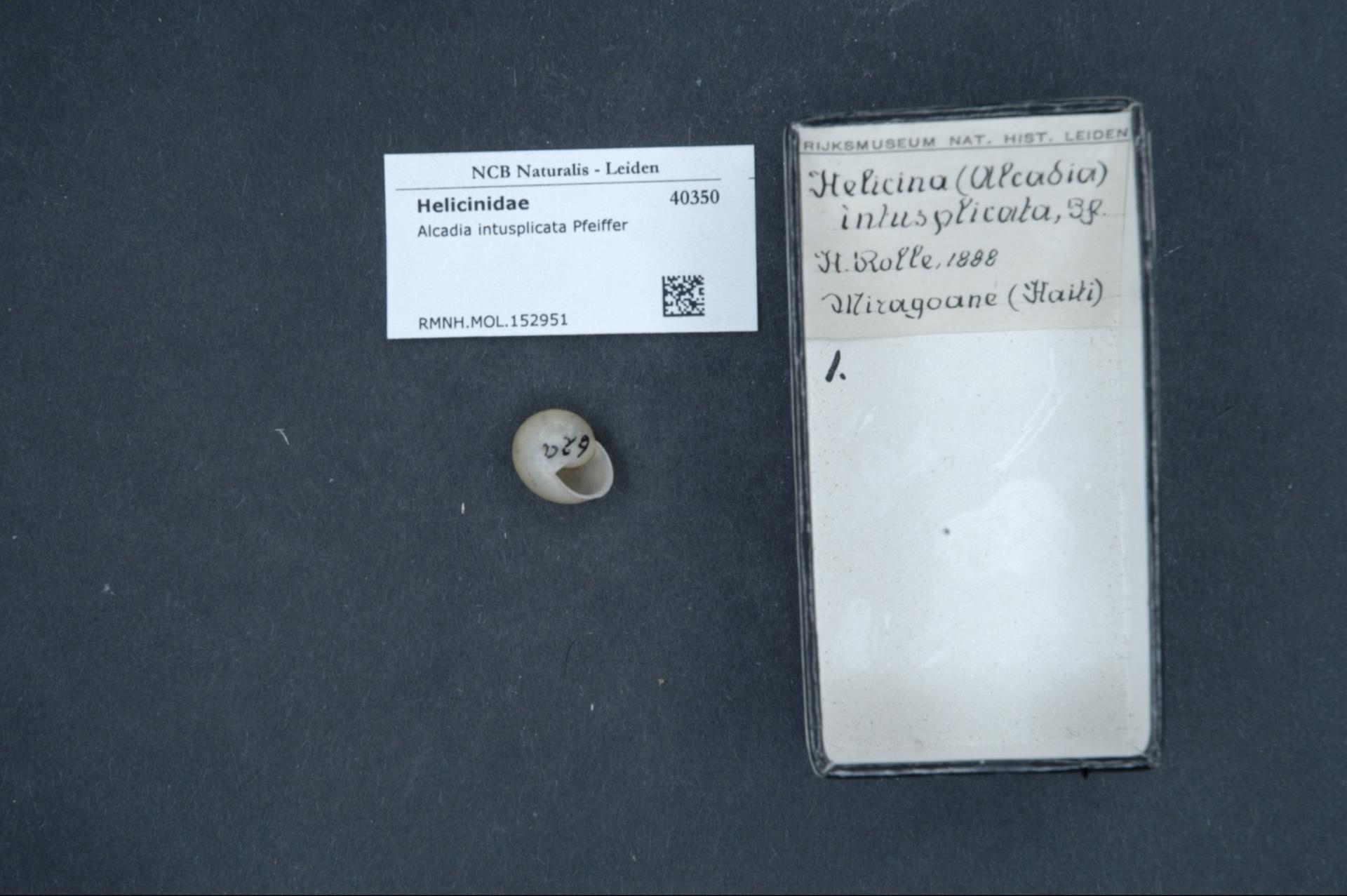
- Shell of Alcadia intusplicata (specimen at Naturalis Biodiversity Center)

Scientific classification
- Kingdom: Animalia
- Phylum: Mollusca
- Class: Gastropoda
- Order: Cycloneritida
- Family: Helicinidae
- Genus: Alcadia
- Species: A. intusplicata

Binomial name
- Alcadia intusplicata (L. Pfeiffer, 1851)

Synonyms
- Alcadia (Intusplicata) intusplicata (L. Pfeiffer, 1851) · alternative representation; Helicina intusplicata L. Pfeiffer, 1851 (original combination)

= Alcadia intusplicata =

Species of gastropod

Alcadia intusplicata is a species of an operculate land snail, terrestrial gastropod mollusk in the family Helicinidae.

== Subspecies ==
There are two subspecies recognized in this species:

- Alcadia intusplicata intusplicata (L. Pfeiffer, 1851)
- Alcadia intusplicata smithiana (L. Pfeiffer, 1866)

== Description ==
The height of the shell attains 7.5 mm (0.30 in), its greatest diameter 10 mm (0.39 in).

== Distribution ==
This species occurs in Hispaniola.
