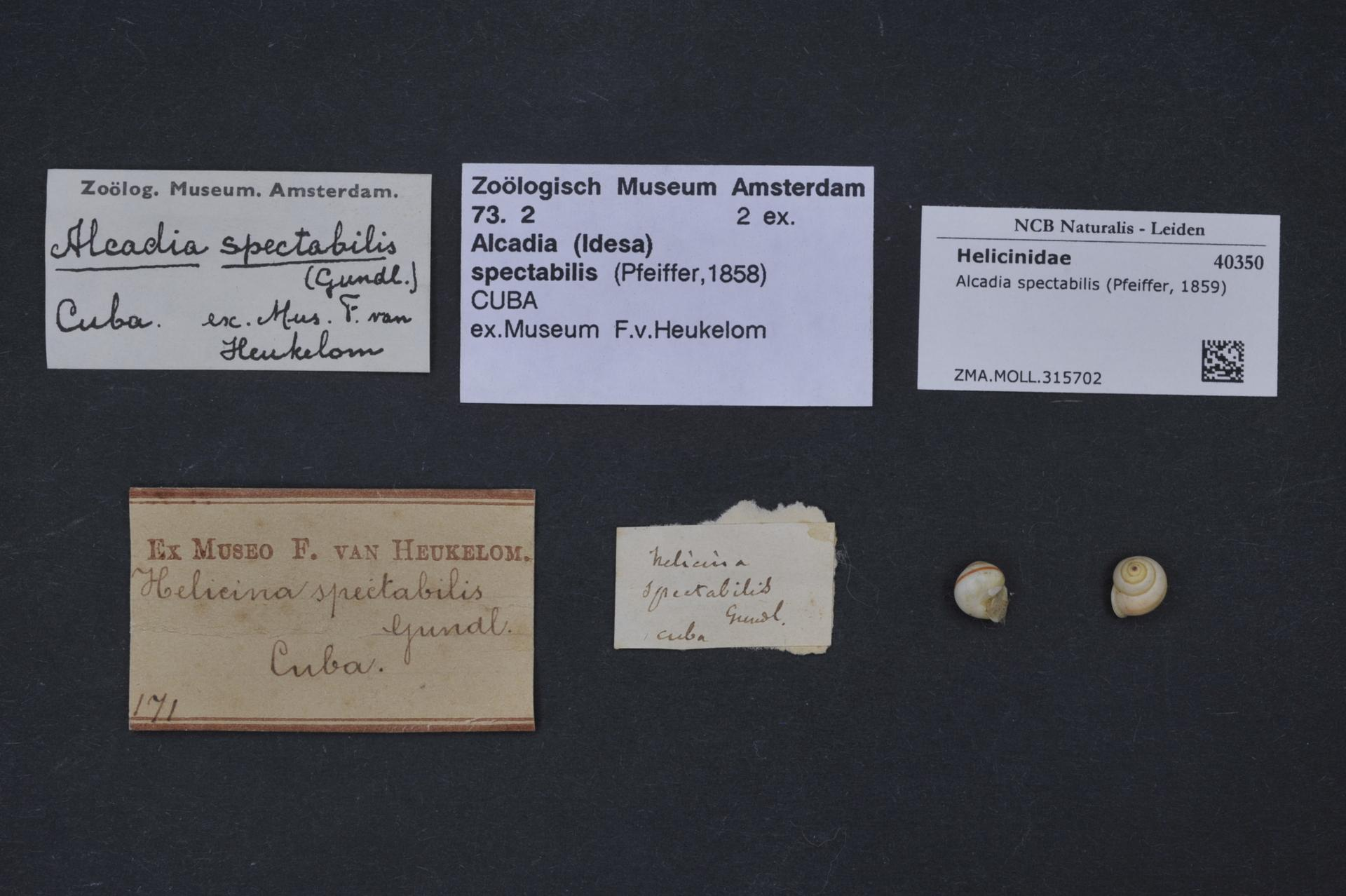
- Shell of Alcadia spectabilis (specimen at Naturalis Biodiversity Center)

Scientific classification
- Kingdom: Animalia
- Phylum: Mollusca
- Class: Gastropoda
- Order: Cycloneritida
- Family: Helicinidae
- Genus: Alcadia
- Species: A. spectabilis

Binomial name
- Alcadia spectabilis (Pfeiffer, 1858)

Synonyms
- Alcadia (Idesa) spectabilis (L. Pfeiffer, 1858) alternative representation; Alcadia (Leialcadia) bellula (L. Pfeiffer, 1859); Alcadia (Leialcadia) bellula bellissima A. J. Wagner, 1908; Alcadia (Leialcadia) bellula leptochila A. J. Wagner, 1908; Alcadia (Leialcadia) spectabilis (L. Pfeiffer, 1858); Alcadia (Leialcadia) spectabilis venusta A. J. Wagner, 1908 junior subjective synonym; Helicina (Pachystoma) bellula L. Pfeiffer, 1859 superseded combination; Helicina bellula L. Pfeiffer, 1859 junior subjective synonym; Helicina bellula var. peripherica L. Pfeiffer, 1859; Helicina bellula var. suturalis L. Pfeiffer, 1859; Helicina bellula var. yunquensis L. Pfeiffer, 1865; Helicina spectabilis L. Pfeiffer, 1858 (original combination)

= Alcadia spectabilis =

Species of gastropod

Alcadia spectabilis is a species of an operculate land snail, terrestrial gastropod mollusk in the family Helicinidae.

== Description ==
The height of the shell attains 6 mm (0.24 in), its greatest diameter 8 mm (0.31 in).

(Original description in Latin) The conical-globose shell is somewhat thin, smooth and shiny. It is yellow with a darker or blood-red peripheral band, or pink with a blood-red band. The spire is convex-conical with a sharp, dark blood-red apex. It has 5 slightly convex whorls, with the body whorl rounded and scarcely equal to the spire. The columella is short, receding, slightly toothed at the base, and emits a circumscribed callus. The aperture is oblique and broadly semi-oval. The peristome is thin and expanded, with the basal margin forming a slightly right angle with the columella. The operculum is transparent, purplish, and pale on the columellar side.

== Distribution ==
This species lives in Cuba.
