= Alcadia camagueyana =

Scientific classification
- Kingdom: Animalia
- Phylum: Mollusca
- Class: Gastropoda
- Order: Cycloneritida
- Family: Helicinidae
- Genus: Alcadia
- Species: A. camagueyana

Binomial name
- Alcadia camagueyana Aguayo & Jaume, 1957

Synonyms
- Alcadia (Glyptalcadia) camagueyana Aguayo & Jaume, 1957 alternative representation; Alcadia (Penisoltia) camagueyana Aguayo & Jaume, 1957; Alcadia (Penisoltia) camagueyana ecarinata Aguayo & Jaume, 1957 (junior synonym); Alcadia (Penisoltia) camagueyana porosa Aguayo & Jaume, 1957 (junior synonym)

Species of gastropod

Alcadia camagueyana is a species of an operculate land snail, terrestrial gastropod mollusk in the family Helicinidae.

== Description ==
The shell is 4 mm (0.16 in) high, its greatest diameter 6 mm (0.24 in).

== Distribution ==
This species occurs in Cuba.
