= Alcadia succinea =

Scientific classification
- Kingdom: Animalia
- Phylum: Mollusca
- Class: Gastropoda
- Order: Cycloneritida
- Family: Helicinidae
- Genus: Alcadia
- Species: A. succinea

Binomial name
- Alcadia succinea (Pfeiffer, 1850)

Synonyms
- Helicina succinea L. Pfeiffer, 1850 (original combination)

Species of gastropod

Alcadia succinea is a species of an operculate land snail, terrestrial gastropod mollusk in the family Helicinidae.

== Description ==
The height of the shell attains 5.5 mm, its greatest diameter 8 mm.

(Original description in Latin) The orbicular-conoidal shell is thin (granular under the lens) transparent and shiny. It is reddish-amber, equipped with rows of black hairs (obsolete on the body whorl). The spire is conoidal and somewhat pointed.Iit contains nearly 5 slightly convex whorls, scarcely descending. The body whorl is large. The aperture is slightly oblique and is semi-oval. The columella is very short and vertical. It forms a sharp denticle at the base, emitting a thin, granular callus. The thin peristome is shortly expanded, the upper margin somewhat undulating, the basal margin notched at the columella. The reddish operculum solid and shell-like.

== Distribution ==
This species lives in the Dominican Republic and Haiti.
