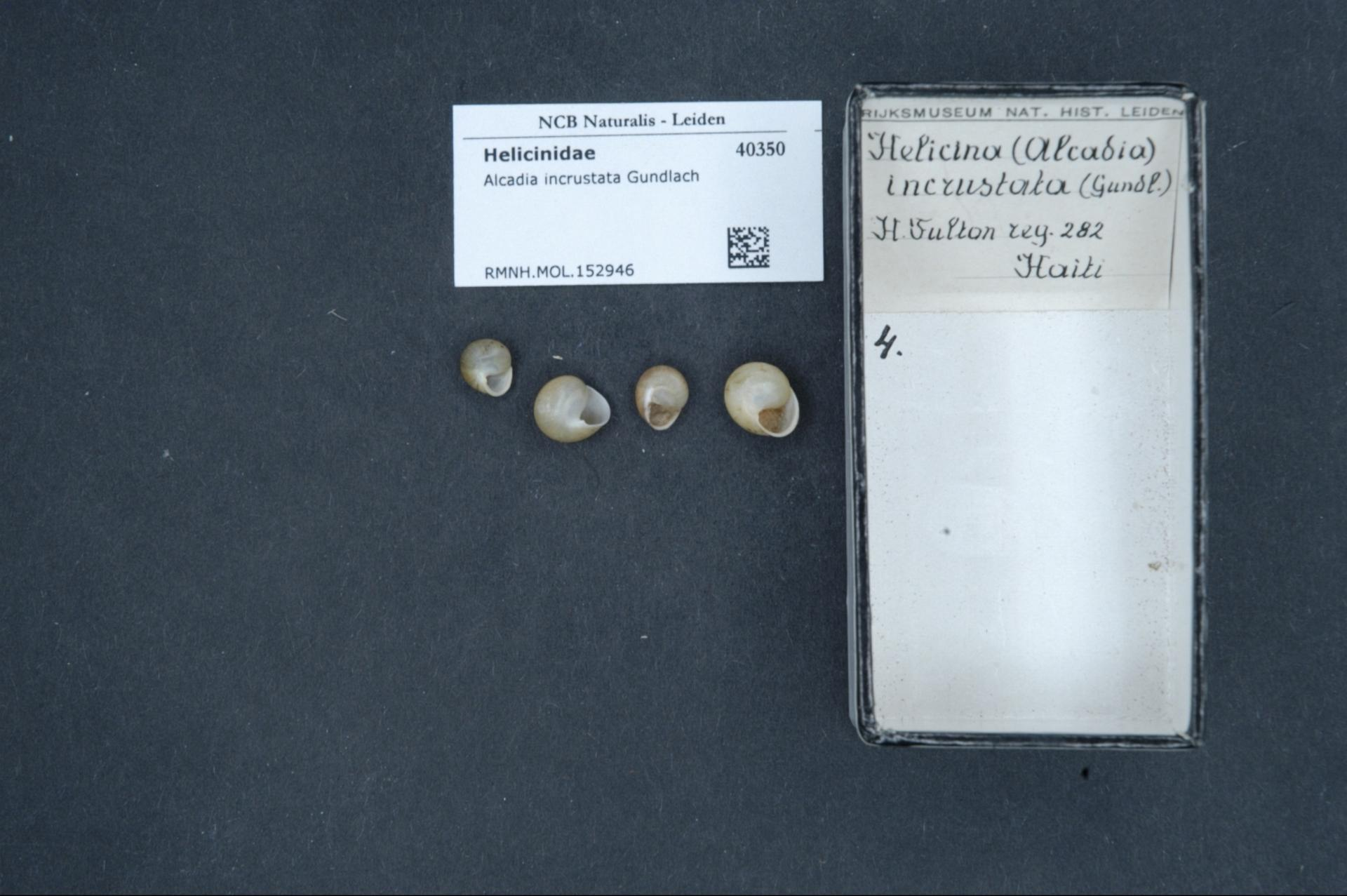
- Shell of Alcadia incrustata (specimen at Naturalis Biodiversity Center)

Scientific classification
- Kingdom: Animalia
- Phylum: Mollusca
- Class: Gastropoda
- Order: Cycloneritida
- Family: Helicinidae
- Genus: Alcadia
- Species: A. incrustata

Binomial name
- Alcadia incrustata (L. Pfeiffer, 1859)

Synonyms
- Helicina incrustata L. Pfeiffer, 1859

= Alcadia incrustata =

Species of gastropod

Alcadia incrustata is a species of an operculate land snail, terrestrial gastropod mollusk in the family Helicinidae.

== Description ==
The height of the shell attains 6.5 mm (0.26 in), its greatest diameter 10 mm (0.39 in).

(Original description in Latin) The shell has a conoid-depressed shape and is rather thin, showing serial hairs. It is reddish with a blackish covering. The spire is short and conical. There are 5 moderately convex whorls, with the body whorl rounded at the periphery and a shiny, broad, somewhat circumscribed callus at the base. The aperture is nearly diagonal and semi-oval. The columella is somewhat compressed, ending forward in a small denticle. The peristome is scarcely expanded, with the basal margin very slightly arched, forming a small sinus with the columellar tooth. The operculum is thin and pearly.

== Distribution ==
This species occurs in Cuba.
