= Alcadia binneyana =

Scientific classification
- Kingdom: Animalia
- Phylum: Mollusca
- Class: Gastropoda
- Order: Cycloneritida
- Family: Helicinidae
- Genus: Alcadia
- Species: A. binneyana

Binomial name
- Alcadia binneyana (L. Pfeiffer, 1866)

Synonyms
- Helicina binneyana L. Pfeiffer, 1866

Species of gastropod

Alcadia binneyana is a species of an operculate land snail, terrestrial gastropod mollusk in the family Helicinidae.

== Description ==
The shell is 4 mm (0.16 in) high, its greatest diameter 6 mm (0.24 in).

== Distribution ==
This species occurs in Haiti, Hispaniola.
