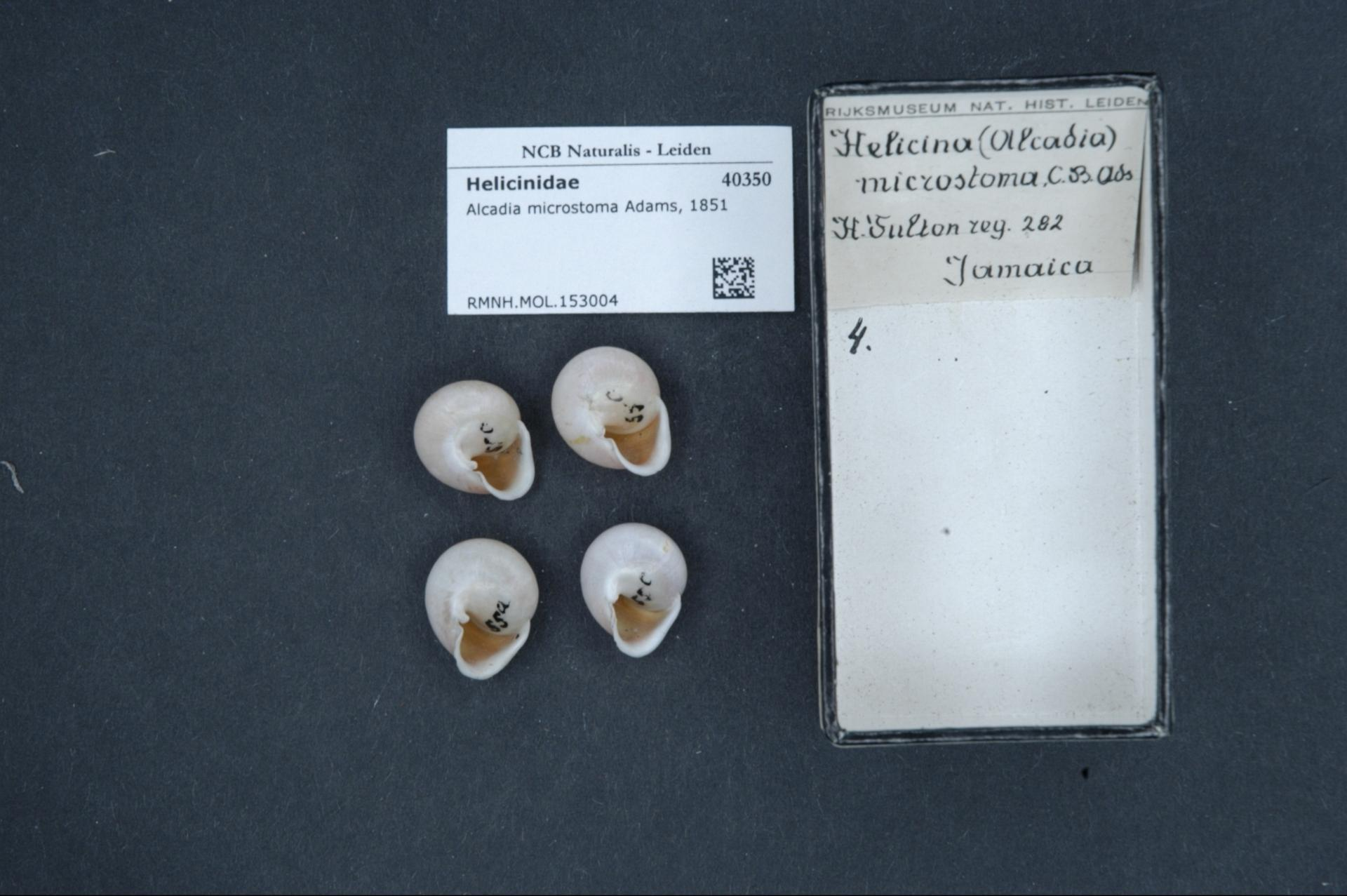
- Shell of Alcadia microstoma (specimen at Naturalis Biodiversity Center)

Scientific classification
- Kingdom: Animalia
- Phylum: Mollusca
- Class: Gastropoda
- Order: Cycloneritida
- Family: Helicinidae
- Genus: Alcadia
- Species: A. microstoma

Binomial name
- Alcadia microstoma (C. B. Adams, 1851)

Synonyms
- Alcadia (Palliata) microstoma (C. B. Adams, 1851) alternative representation; Helicina (Alcadia) microstoma C. B. Adams, 1851 superseded combination; Helicina microstoma C. B. Adams, 1851 (original combination)

= Alcadia microstoma =

Species of gastropod

Alcadia microstoma is a species of an operculate land snail, terrestrial gastropod mollusk in the family Helicinidae.

== Description ==
(Original description) The shell is globose-conic and moderately thickened, with a brown coloration that shades off to a smoky white along the suture and the periphery of the body whorl. It features rather light growth striae, interspersed with a few spiral series of punctures. The apex is obtuse, and the spire's outlines are variably curvilinear. The shell has slightly fewer than five moderately convex whorls with a well-impressed suture. The body whorl is subplanulate beneath. The aperture is semi-elliptical, compressed above and below, and laterally dilated. The outer lip is sinuate, well-expanded, and reflected except at the extremities, with a slit that is rather wide but not very deep.

== Distribution ==
This species occurs in Jamaica.
