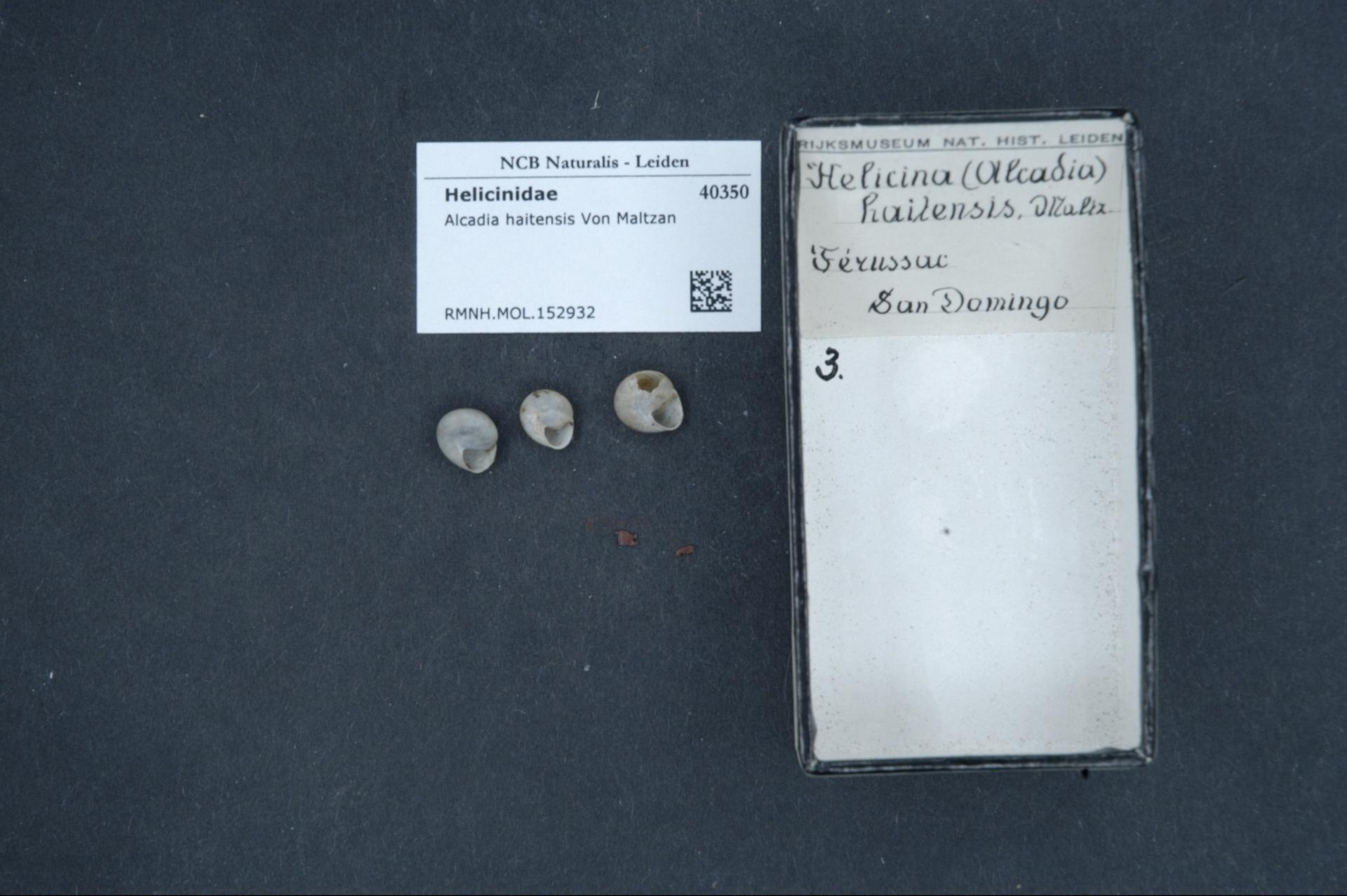
- Shell of Alcadia haitensis (specimen at Naturalis Biodiversity Center)

Scientific classification
- Kingdom: Animalia
- Phylum: Mollusca
- Class: Gastropoda
- Order: Cycloneritida
- Family: Helicinidae
- Genus: Alcadia
- Species: A. haitensis

Binomial name
- Alcadia haitensis (Maltzan, 1888)

Synonyms
- Helicina haitensis Maltzan, 1888 (original combination)

= Alcadia haitensis =

Species of gastropod

Alcadia haitensis is a species of an operculate land snail, terrestrial gastropod mollusk in the family Helicinidae.

== Description ==
The height of the shell attains 6 mm, its greatest diameter 8.5 mm.

(Original description in Latin) The imperforate shell is depressively globose, obtusely angular and somewhat translucent. It is yellowish-brown and shiny. It is very finely striated. The shell contains 4.5 whorls. These are barely convex, and are separated by a suture that is initially linear, then impressed and slightly crenulated under a lens. The whorls are increasing fairly quickly but regularly. The body whorl is obtusely angular, slightly convex at the base, only slightly depressed at the umbilicus, and very briefly deflected at the front. The aperture is oblique, semi-ovate, slightly lunate, with a simple, white peristome. The lips are distant, with the outer lip narrow and depressed. The basal margin is almost horizontal, forming an almost right angle with the very short vertical columellar margin. The columellar callus is thin, translucent, expanded, defined below by a groove, and joined with the insertion of the outer lip.

== Distribution ==
This species occurs in Haiti.
