= Alcadia blandiana =

Scientific classification
- Kingdom: Animalia
- Phylum: Mollusca
- Class: Gastropoda
- Order: Cycloneritida
- Family: Helicinidae
- Genus: Alcadia
- Species: A. blandiana

Binomial name
- Alcadia blandiana Weinland, 1880

Species of gastropod

Alcadia blandiana is a species of an operculate land snail, terrestrial gastropod mollusk in the family Helicinidae.

== Description ==
(Original description in Latin) The shell is conical and obtusely keeled, with a reddish-brown, uniform coloration. It is scarcely striated and slightly bristly with very small deciduous hairs. The suture is linearly impressed. The spire is short, conical, and somewhat obtuse. The shell has four whorls, with the upper whorls being scarcely convex and the body whorl large and rounded. The columella is short and oblique, with a distinct, rounded notch that separates it from the peristome. The aperture is diagonal and broadly semi-oval. The peristome is simple and somewhat expanded, with a sinuous upper margin and a straighter basal margin. The basal callus is thin, slightly indented, and paler in color.

== Distribution ==
This species occurs in Haiti, Hispaniola.
