= Alcadia pellucida =

Scientific classification
- Kingdom: Animalia
- Phylum: Mollusca
- Class: Gastropoda
- Order: Cycloneritida
- Family: Helicinidae
- Genus: Alcadia
- Species: A. pellucida

Binomial name
- Alcadia pellucida (G. B. Sowerby II, 1842)

Synonyms
- Helicina pellucida G. B. Sowerby II, 1842 ·

Species of gastropod

Alcadia pellucida is a species of an operculate land snail, terrestrial gastropod mollusk in the family Helicinidae.

== Description ==
(Original description in Latin) The shell is similar to Helicina zephyrina Duclos, 1833, but with the columella nearly straight and somewhat angular.

A more transparent shell than Helicina zephyrina, with the columella nearly straight, and joining the outer lip at an angle.

== Distribution ==
This species occurs in French Guiana.
