= Alcadia lewisi =

Scientific classification
- Kingdom: Animalia
- Phylum: Mollusca
- Class: Gastropoda
- Order: Cycloneritida
- Family: Helicinidae
- Genus: Alcadia
- Species: A. lewisi

Binomial name
- Alcadia lewisi Pilsbry, 1942

Species of gastropod

Alcadia lewisi is a species of an operculate land snail, terrestrial gastropod mollusk in the family Helicinidae.

== Description ==
The height of the shell attains 3 mm, its greatest diameter 4.5 mm.

== Distribution ==
This species occurs in the Cayman Islands.
