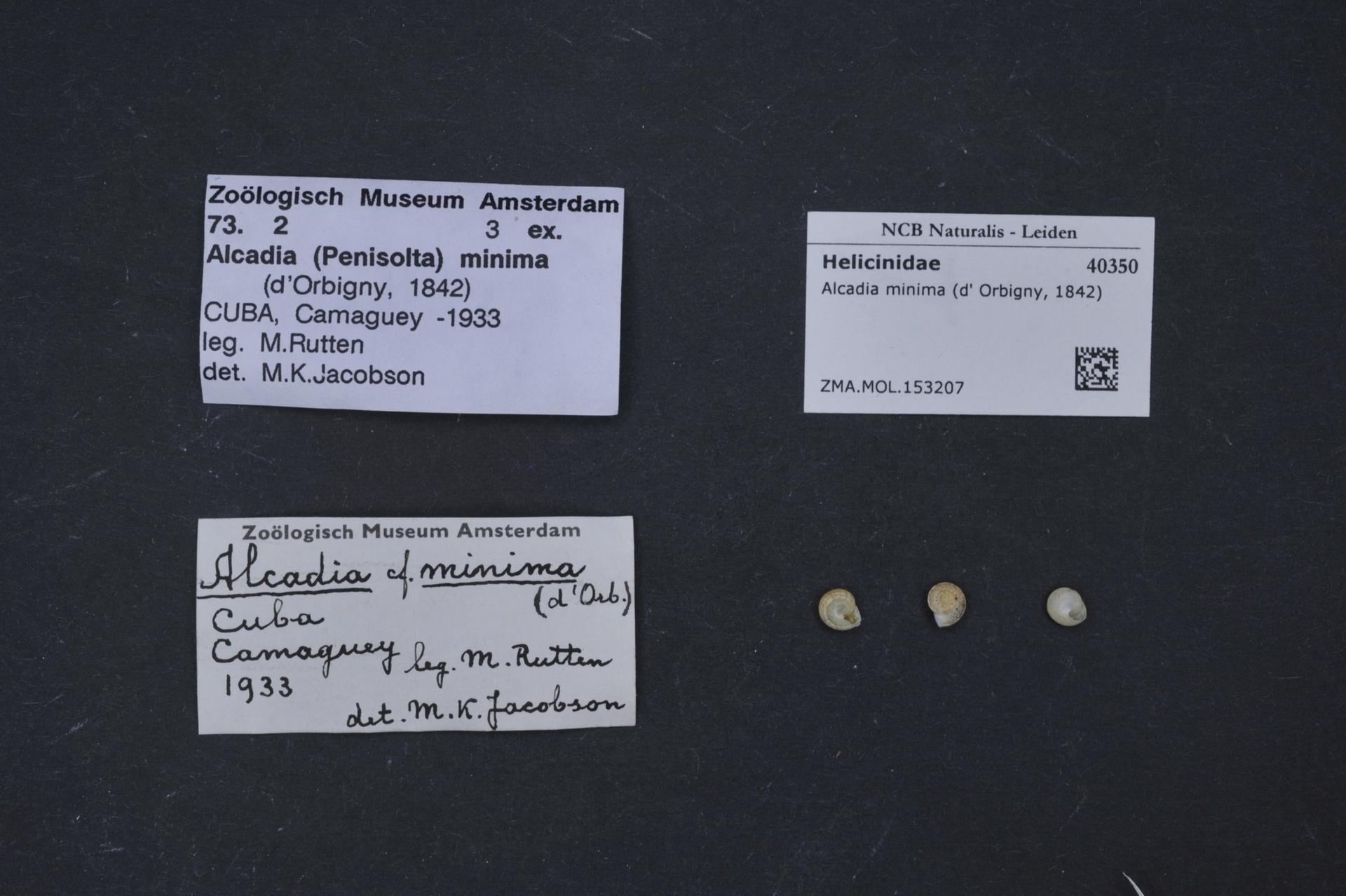
- Shell of Alcadia minima (specimen at Naturalis Biodiversity Center)

Scientific classification
- Domain: Eukaryota
- Kingdom: Animalia
- Phylum: Mollusca
- Class: Gastropoda
- Subclass: Neritimorpha
- Order: Cycloneritida
- Family: Helicinidae
- Genus: Alcadia
- Species: A. minima

Binomial name
- Alcadia minima (A. d'Orbigny, 1842)

Synonyms
- Alcadia (Penisoltia) minima (A. d'Orbigny, 1842) alternative representation; Alcadia capax L. Pfeiffer, 1857 (junior synonym); Alcadia gundlachi L. Pfeiffer, 1854; Alcadia quinonesi Clench & Aguayo, 1950 (junior synonym); Alcadia quiñonesi Clench & Aguayo, 1950 misspelling - incorrect original spelling; Helicina minima A. d'Orbigny, 1842 (original combination); Helicina montana L. Pfeiffer, 1864 (junior synonym); Helicina proxima L. Pfeiffer, 1858 junior subjective synonym

= Alcadia minima =

Species of gastropod

Alcadia minima is a species of an operculate land snail, terrestrial gastropod mollusk in the family Helicinidae.

== Description ==
The height of the shell attains 6 mm (0.24 in), its greatest diameter 7.5 mm (0.30 in).

(Original description in Latin) The smooth shell has a rotund-depressed shape. It is rose-white. The spire is short and contains five, convex-flat whorls. The aperture is semi-lunar with a thin, reflexed outer lip. The columella is minimally thickened. The aperture shows a toothed, notched columellar angle.

== Distribution ==
This species occurs in Cuba.
