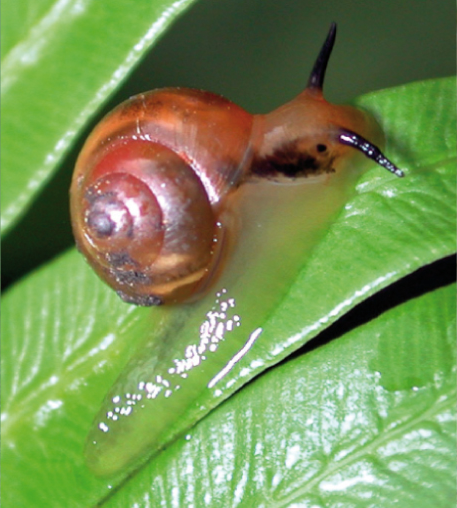
- Alcadia conuloides
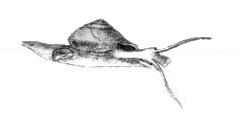
- Alcadia maxima

Scientific classification
- Kingdom: Animalia
- Phylum: Mollusca
- Class: Gastropoda
- Order: Cycloneritida
- Superfamily: Helicinoidea
- Family: Helicinidae
- Subfamily: Helicininae
- Genus: Alcadia; Gray, 1840

Type species
- Helicina major J. E. Gray, 1824
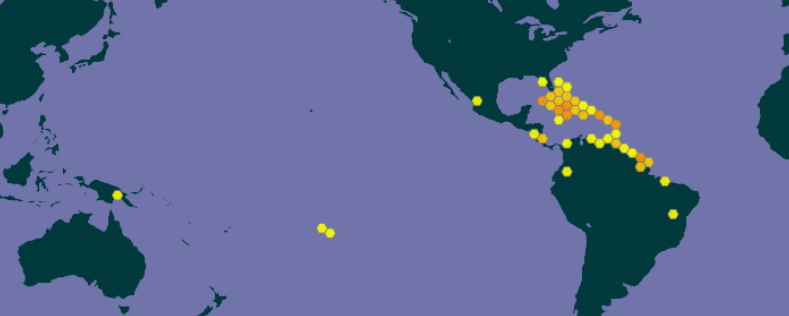

Synonyms
- See list

= Alcadia =

Genus of gastropods

Alcadia is a genus of tropical and subtropical land snails with an operculum, terrestrial gastropod mollusks in the subfamily Helicininae of the family Helicinidae.

== Description ==
Alcadia differs from the Helicininae in having a slit in front of the aperture, into which is fitted the tooth-like process of the operculum.

== Species ==
Species within the genus Alcadia include:

- Alcadia affinis C.B. Adams, 1846
- Alcadia alta (G. B. Sowerby II, 1866)
- Alcadia aurantia (J. E. Gray, 1824)
- Alcadia bahamensis (L. Pfeiffer, 1862)
- Alcadia bermudezi Aguayo & Jaume, 1957
- Alcadia binneyana (L. Pfeiffer, 1866)
- Alcadia blandiana Weinland, 1880
- Alcadia boeckeleri (Richling, 2001)
- Alcadia brownii (J. E. Gray, 1824)
- Alcadia bullula Hausdorf, 2006
- Alcadia camagueyana Aguayo & Jaume, 1957
- Alcadia charmosyne (Pilsbry, 1933)
- Alcadia chocoensis Roosen, 2023
- Alcadia citrinolabris (C. B. Adams, 1849)
- Alcadia concinna (Gundlach in Pfeiffer, 1857)
- Alcadia consanguinea (C. B. Adams, 1851)
- Alcadia conuloides (Guppy, 1868)
- Alcadia decussata Hausdorf, 2006
- Alcadia delmonteana Pilsbry, 1933
- Alcadia dissimulans (Poey, 1858)
- Alcadia dubiosa (C. B. Adams, 1850)
- Alcadia erythrozona Dean, 1931
- Alcadia euglypta Clench & Aguayo, 1950
- Alcadia exigua (L. Pfeiffer, 1849)
- Alcadia gonavensis Weinland, 1880
- Alcadia gonostoma (Gundlach in Poey, 1858)
- Alcadia guadaloupensis (G. B. Sowerby II, 1842)
- Alcadia haitensis (Maltzan, 1888)
- Alcadia hirsuta (C. B. Adams, 1851)
- Alcadia hispida (Pfeiffer, 1839)
- Alcadia hjalmarsoni (L. Pfeiffer, 1856)
- Alcadia hojarasca (Richling, 2001)
- Alcadia hollandi (C. B. Adams, 1849)
- Alcadia iheringi A. J. Wagner, 1911
- Alcadia incrustata (Gundlach in Pfeiffer, 1859)
- Alcadia intusplicata (L. Pfeiffer, 1851)
- Alcadia jamaicensis (G. B. Sowerby II, 1842)
- Alcadia kuehni (L. Pfeiffer, 1872)
- Alcadia lewisi Pilsbry, 1942
- Alcadia macilenta (C. B. Adams, 1849)
- Alcadia major (J. E. Gray, 1824)
- Alcadia mammilla Weinland, 1862
- Alcadia maxima G.B. Sowerby II, 1842
- Alcadia mcleani Clench, 1937
- Alcadia megastoma (C. B. Adams, 1849)
- Alcadia microstoma (C. B. Adams, 1851)
- Alcadia minima (d’Orbigny, 1842)
- Alcadia moussoniana (L. Pfeiffer, 1866)
- Alcadia neebiana (Pfeiffer, 1862)
- Alcadia nitida (Pfeiffer, 1839)
- Alcadia nobilis (C. B. Adams, 1851)
- Alcadia nodulosa Hausdorf, 2006
- Alcadia novogranadensis Hausdorf, 2006
- Alcadia nuda (Arango in Pfeiffer, 1866)
- Alcadia pellucida (G. B. Sowerby II, 1842)
- Alcadia pompholyx (Pilsbry, 1933)
- Alcadia pusilla (C. B. Adams, 1850)
- Alcadia rhamphostyla (L. Pfeiffer, 1857)
- Alcadia rotunda (d’Orbigny, 1842)
- Alcadia rufa (L. Pfeiffer, 1857)
- Alcadia schrammi (Crosse, 1872)
- Alcadia sericea (Drouët, 1859)
- Alcadia solitaria (C. B. Adams, 1845)
- Alcadia spectabilis (Pfeiffer, 1858)
- Alcadia succinea (L. Pfeiffer, 1850)
- Alcadia velutina (Poey, 1858)

== Synonyms of Alcadia ==
- Alcadia (Alcadia) J. E. Gray, 1840 · alternative representation
- Alcadia (Bellula) A. J. Wagner, 1908 junior subjective synonym
- Alcadia (Eualcadia) A. J. Wagner, 1907 junior subjective synonym
- Alcadia (Glyptalcadia) Boss & Jacobson, 1973 · alternative representation
- Alcadia (Hispida) A. J. Wagner, 1907 junior homonym (invalid; not Bate, 1868, Penisoltia is a replacement name)
- Alcadia (Hjalmarsona) H. B. Baker, 1940 · alternative representation
- Alcadia (Idesa) H. Adams & A. Adams, 1856 alternative representation
- Alcadia (Incrustata) A. J. Wagner, 1907 junior homonym
- Alcadia (Intusplicata) A. J. Wagner, 1907 alternative representation
- Alcadia (Leialcadia) A. J. Wagner, 1907 (junior synonym)
- Alcadia (Mamilla) A. J. Wagner, 1907 alternative representation
- Alcadia (Megastoma) A. J. Wagner, 1907 junior homonym (invalid; not Rafinesque, 1814)
- Alcadia (Microalcadia) Richling, 2004 alternative representation
- Alcadia (Palliata) A. J. Wagner, 1907 alternative representation
- Alcadia (Penisoltia) H. B. Baker, 1954 alternative representation
- Alcadia (Weinlandella) H. B. Baker, 1954 unavailable name (unnecessary replacement name for Mamilla)
- Eualcadia A. J. Wagner, 1907 (junior synonym)
- Helicina (Alcadia) J. E. Gray, 1840 (unaccepted rank)
- Helicina (Idesa) H. Adams & A. Adams, 1856 superseded combination
- Helicina (Isoltia) Guppy, 1895 junior subjective synonym
- Helicina (Schrammia) Guppy, 1895 superseded combination
- Hispida A. J. Wagner, 1907 (invalid; not Bate, 1868, Penisoltia is a replacement name)
- Idesa H. Adams & A. Adams, 1856 ·
- Isoltia Guppy, 1895 (junior synonym)
- Leialcadia A. J. Wagner, 1907 ·
- Schrammia Guppy, 1895 junior subjective synonym

== Synonyms ==
- Alcadia appuni (E. von Martens, 1873): synonym of Helicina tamsiana appuni E. von Martens, 1873 (superseded combination)
- Alcadia balteata Aguayo & Jaume, 1954: synonym of Alcadia minima (A. d'Orbigny, 1842) (junior synonym)
- Alcadia capax L. Pfeiffer, 1857: synonym of Alcadia minima (A. d'Orbigny, 1842) (junior synonym)
- Alcadia ciliata (Poey, 1852): synonym of Emoda ciliata (Poey, 1852) ( superseded combination)
- Alcadia colombiana (R. A. Philippi, 1847): synonym of Helicina columbiana R. A. Philippi, 1847 (superseded combination)
- Alcadia deppeana (E. von Martens, 1863): synonym of Helicina zephyrina deppeana E. von Martens, 1863 (superseded rank and combination)
- Alcadia dysoni (L. Pfeiffer, 1849): synonym of Helicina dysoni L. Pfeiffer, 1849 (unaccepted combination)
- Alcadia gundlachi L. Pfeiffer, 1854: synonym of Alcadia (Penisoltia) minima (A. d'Orbigny, 1842) represented as Alcadia minima (A. d'Orbigny, 1842)
- Alcadia quinonesi Clench & Aguayo, 1950: synonym of Alcadia minima (A. d'Orbigny, 1842) (junior synonym)
- Alcadia quiñonesi Clench & Aguayo, 1950: synonym of Alcadia minima (A. d'Orbigny, 1842) (misspelling - incorrect original spelling)
- Alcadia striata (Lamarck, 1822): synonym of Helicina striata Lamarck, 1822 (superseded combination)
- Alcadia subfusca (Menke, 1828): synonym of Alcadia striata (Lamarck, 1822): synonym of Helicina striata Lamarck, 1822 (junior synonym)
- Alcadia tamsiana (L. Pfeiffer, 1851): synonym of Helicina tamsiana L. Pfeiffer, 1851 (superseded combination)
