= Alcadia bermudezi =

Scientific classification
- Kingdom: Animalia
- Phylum: Mollusca
- Class: Gastropoda
- Order: Cycloneritida
- Family: Helicinidae
- Genus: Alcadia
- Species: A. bermudezi

Binomial name
- Alcadia bermudezi Aguayo & Jaume, 1957

Species of gastropod

Alcadia bermudezi is a species of an operculate land snail, terrestrial gastropod mollusk in the family Helicinidae.

== Subspecies ==
There are two subspecies accepted in this genus:

- Alcadia bermudezi bermudezi Aguayo & Jaume, 1957
- Alcadia bermudezi jatibonica Boss & Jacobson, 1973

== Description ==
The shell is 6.5 mm (0.26 in) high, its greatest diameter 11 mm (0.43 in).

== Distribution ==
This species occurs in Cuba.
