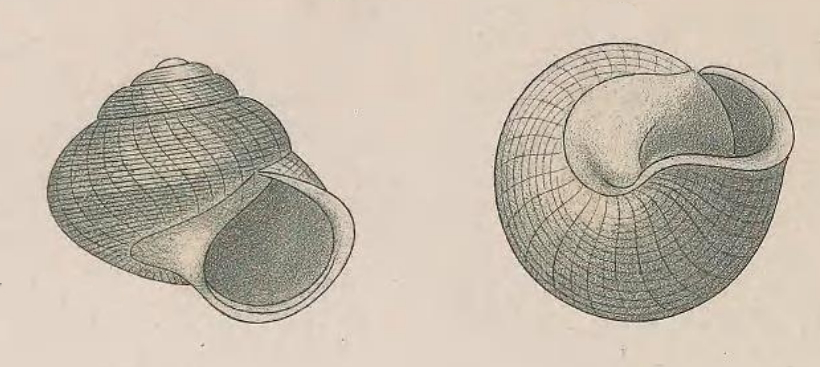
- Shell of Alcadia iheringi (holotype)

Scientific classification
- Kingdom: Animalia
- Phylum: Mollusca
- Class: Gastropoda
- Order: Cycloneritida
- Family: Helicinidae
- Genus: Alcadia
- Species: A. iheringi

Binomial name
- Alcadia iheringi A. J. Wagner, 1911

Synonyms
- Alcadia (Eualcadia) iheringi A. J. Wagner, 1911

= Alcadia iheringi =

Species of gastropod

Alcadia iheringi is a species of an operculate land snail, terrestrial gastropod mollusk in the family Helicinidae.

== Description ==
The height of the shell attains 3.1 mm, its greatest diameter 3.8 mm.

(Original description in German) The shell is broadly conical with a convex base or is nearly spherical. It is white or yellowish horn-colored, featuring dense, very fine raised spiral lines. (weathered specimens may exhibit relatively strong growth lines on the body whorl, likely due to weathering). The broadly conical, slightly convex spire comprises 4 slowly increasing, somewhat convex whorls, separated by a slightly impressed suture. The body whorl is indistinctly angular to rounded and descends very little or not at all in front.

The rounded triangular aperture is slightly oblique, with the slightly thickened outer lip being briefly expanded and reflexed. The basal margin is convex and extended forward. The very short, thin columella is curved forward and outward, and the thin basal callus is fairly clearly defined.

== Distribution ==
This species occurs in Brazil (São Paulo, Rio de Janeiro)
