= Alcadia macilenta =

Scientific classification
- Kingdom: Animalia
- Phylum: Mollusca
- Class: Gastropoda
- Order: Cycloneritida
- Family: Helicinidae
- Genus: Alcadia
- Species: A. macilenta

Binomial name
- Alcadia macilenta (C. B. Adams, 1849)

Synonyms
- Alcadia (Palliata) macilenta (C. B. Adams, 1849) · alternative representation; Helicina macilenta C. B. Adams, 1849 (original combination)

Species of gastropod

Alcadia macilenta is a species of an operculate land snail, terrestrial gastropod mollusk in the family Helicinidae.

== Description ==
(Original description) The shell is rather small and thin, subdiscoidal, and flattened beneath, with a pale brown coloration. The epidermis is extremely thin, microscopically hirsute, or chagrined. The spire is slightly elevated and convex, consisting of nearly 4½ whorls that are scarcely convex. The aperture is large, and the outer lip is thin, sharp, moderately expanded, and reflected, featuring a deep curved incision below the columella, similar to that of Alcadia brownii palliata (C. B. Adams, 1849). The elongated columella is strongly margined on the inner side.

== Distribution ==
This species occurs in Jamaica.
