= Alcadia brownii =

Scientific classification
- Kingdom: Animalia
- Phylum: Mollusca
- Class: Gastropoda
- Order: Cycloneritida
- Family: Helicinidae
- Genus: Alcadia
- Species: A. brownii

Binomial name
- Alcadia brownii (J. E. Gray, 1824)

Synonyms
- Alcadia (Palliata) brownii (J. E. Gray, 1824) alternative representation; Helicina (Alcadia) brownei [sic] misspelling - incorrect subsequent spelling; Helicina (Alcadia) brownii J. E. Gray, 1824 superseded combination; Helicina brownii J. E. Gray, 1824 (original combination)

Species of gastropod

Alcadia brownii is a species of an operculate land snail, terrestrial gastropod mollusk in the family Helicinidae.

Subspecies

- Alcadia brownii brownii (J. E. Gray, 1824)
- Alcadia brownii labiosa (C. B. Adams, 1851)
- Alcadia brownii palliata (C. B. Adams, 1849)

== Description ==
(Original description) The pale brown shell is depressed ovate with a smooth and translucent surface. It is convex above and rather convex beneath. The peristome is thickened and reflected, with a white coloration. Both the columella and the inner lip are whitish and slightly thickened. The front part of the aperture near the columellar angle features a spirally curved slit. The operculum is horny and has a process that fits into the slit.

== Distribution ==
This species occurs on Jamaica and The Bahamas
