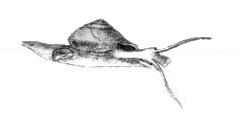

Scientific classification
- Kingdom: Animalia
- Phylum: Mollusca
- Class: Gastropoda
- Order: Cycloneritida
- Family: Helicinidae
- Genus: Alcadia
- Species: A. maxima

Binomial name
- Alcadia maxima Sowerby II, 1842

Synonyms
- Helicina maxima G. B. Sowerby II, 1842 (basionym); Alcadia (Alcadia) maxima (G. B. Sowerby II, 1842); Helicina maxima var. citrina C. B. Adams, 1851

= Alcadia maxima =

Species of gastropod

Alcadia maxima is a species of tropical and subtropical land snails with an operculum, terrestrial gastropod mollusks in the family Helicinidae.
