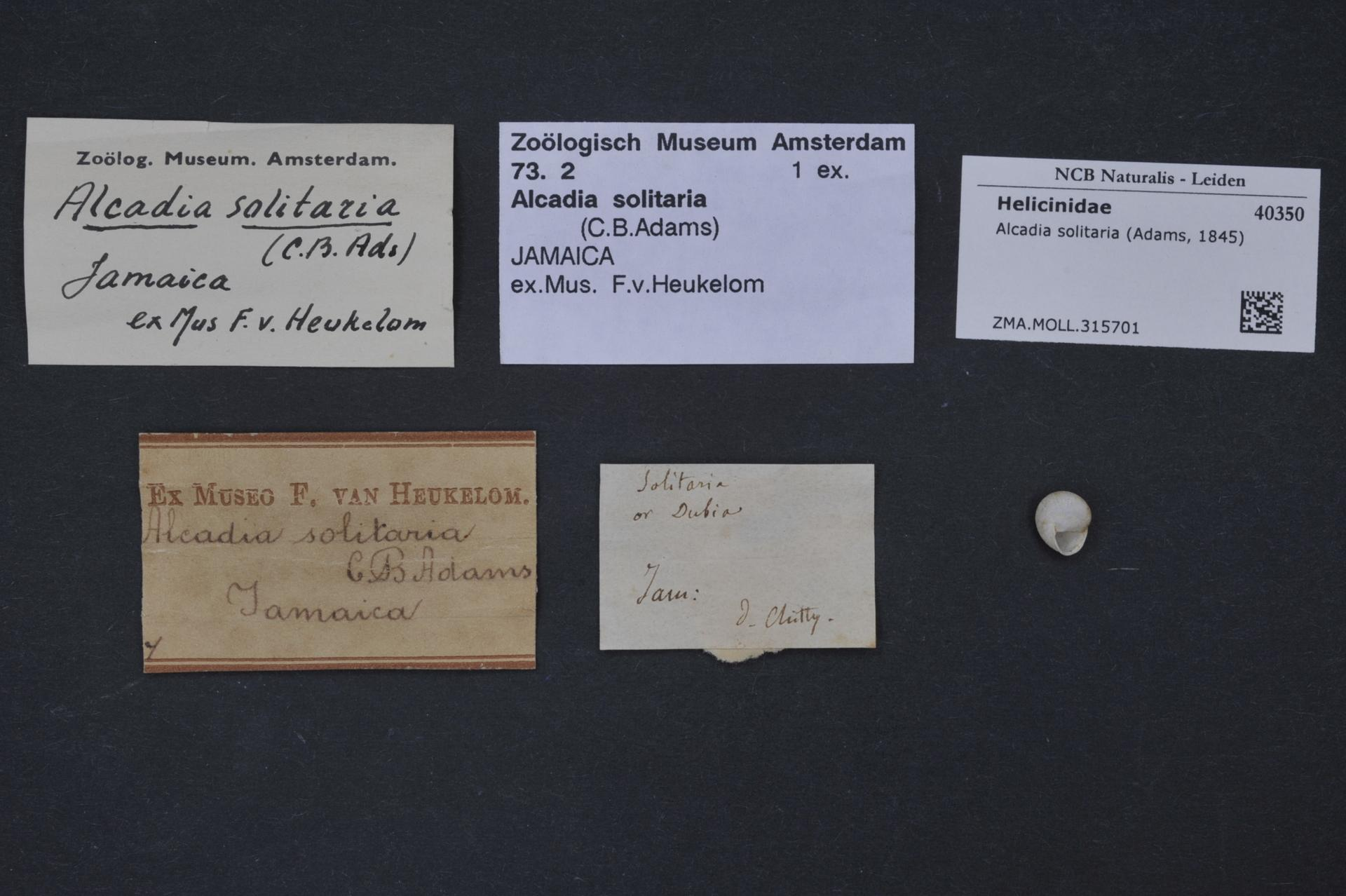
- Shell of Alcadia solitaria (specimen at Naturalis Biodiversity Center)

Scientific classification
- Kingdom: Animalia
- Phylum: Mollusca
- Class: Gastropoda
- Order: Cycloneritida
- Family: Helicinidae
- Genus: Alcadia
- Species: A. solitaria

Binomial name
- Alcadia solitaria (C. B. Adams, 1845)

Synonyms
- Alcadia (Hjalmarsona) solitaria (C. B. Adams, 1845) alternative representation; Helicina guildingiana L. Pfeiffer, 1849 (junior synonym); Helicina solitaria C. B. Adams, 1845 (basionym)

= Alcadia solitaria =

Species of gastropod

Alcadia solitaria is a species of an operculate land snail, terrestrial gastropod mollusk in the family Helicinidae.

== Description ==
The height of the shell attains 5.5 mm (0.22 in), its greatest diameter 6 mm (0.24 in).

(Original description in Latin) The depressed shell has a red color with a brownish tinge. It contains 4.5 smooth whorls. The body whorl is not angular. The aperture is semicircular. The outer lip is notched below. The columella is sharp. The outer lip is somewhat thin, yellow on the outside. The operculum is thin.

== Distribution ==
This species occurs in Jamaica.
