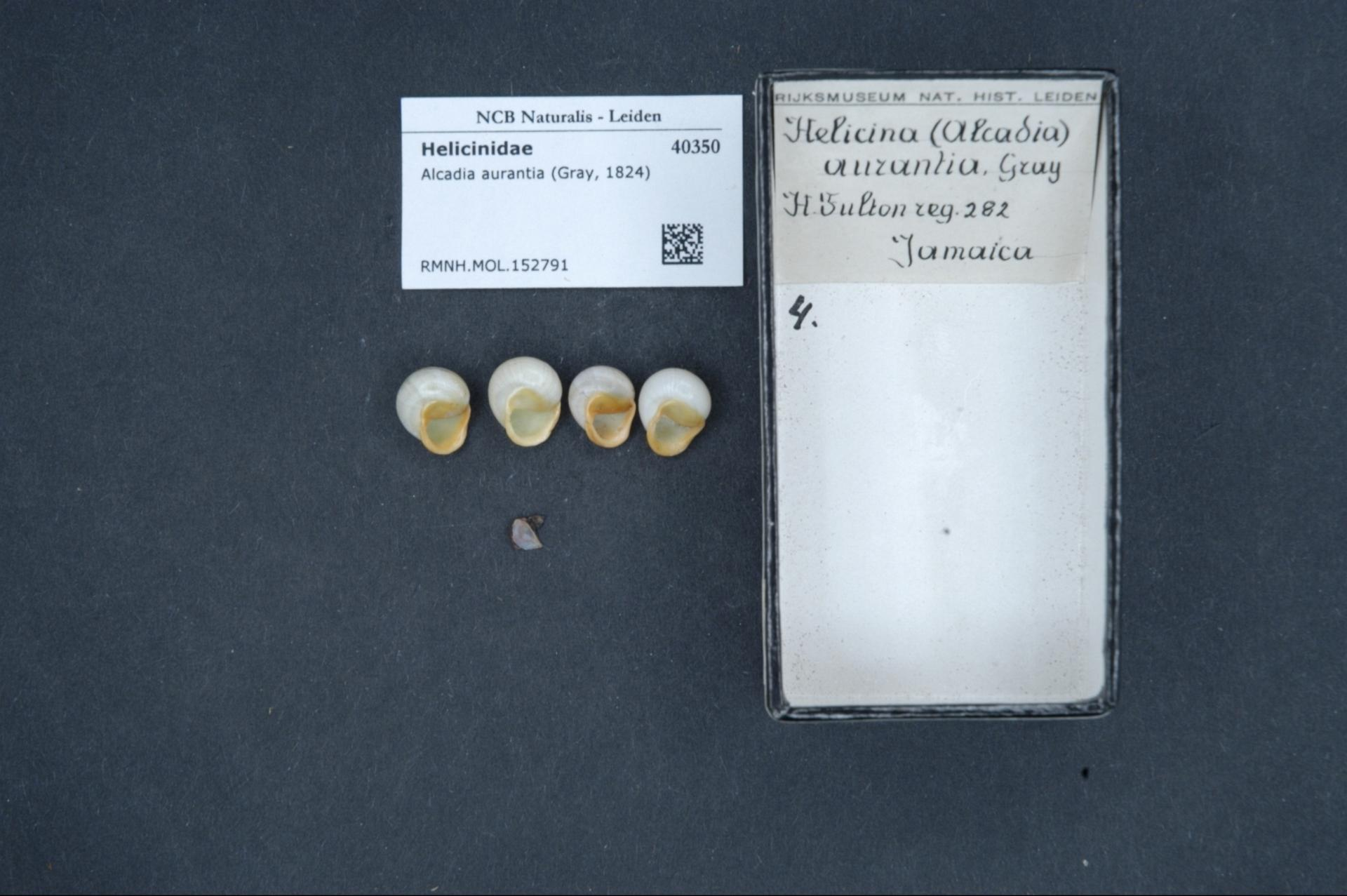
- Shell of Alcadia aurantia (specimen at Naturalis Biodiversity Center)

Scientific classification
- Kingdom: Animalia
- Phylum: Mollusca
- Class: Gastropoda
- Order: Cycloneritida
- Family: Helicinidae
- Genus: Alcadia
- Species: A. aurantia

Binomial name
- Alcadia aurantia (J. E. Gray, 1824)

Synonyms
- Helicina aurantia J. E. Gray, 1824 superseded combination (basionym); Helicina pyrrhostoma Menke, 1828 (original combination; junior synonym)

= Alcadia aurantia =

Species of gastropod

Alcadia aurantia is a species of an operculate land snail, terrestrial gastropod mollusk in the family Helicinidae.

== Description ==
(Original description) The shell is rather depressed globular and ovate, with a purplish-white coloration. It features a narrow reddish-brown band just behind the center, which runs close to the suture of the spire. Occasionally, there are faint reddish lines near the base of the columella. The peristome is thickened and reflected, with an orange-red hue. The inner lip is slightly thickened, and the angle of the aperture next to the columella is callous, forming a small tubercle.

== Distribution ==
This species occurs on Jamaica.
