= Japanese Red List =

List of threatened species

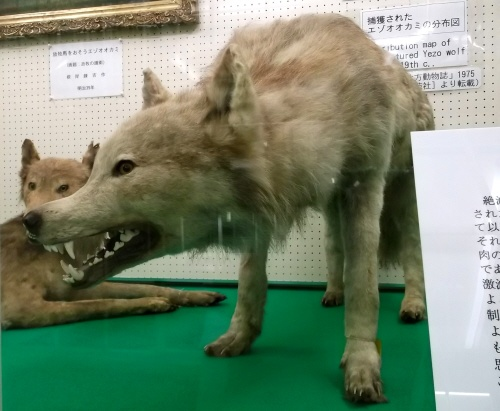
Hokkaido wolf (Canis lupus hattai), one of 110 taxa classed as Extinct on the 2020 Japanese Red List (Hokkaido University Museum)

The Japanese Red List (レッドリスト, reddo risuto) is the Japanese domestic counterpart to the IUCN Red List of Threatened Species. The national Red List is compiled and maintained by the Ministry of the Environment, alongside a separate Red List for marine organisms. Similarly drawing on the relevant scientific authorities, NGOs, and local governments, the Ministry of the Environment also prepares and publishes a Red Data Book (レッドドデータブック, reddo dēta bukku) that provides further information on species and habitats.

The first Red List was published by the then Environmental Agency as part of the first Red Data Book in 1991; in 2020, the fifth edition of the fourth version of the Red List was published. In line with the Marine Biodiversity Conservation Strategy, decided upon by the Ministry in 2011, in 2017 the first Marine Life Red List was published, excluding species subject to international agreements, such as those within the remit of the Western and Central Pacific Fisheries Commission (WCPFC) (e.g., Pacific bluefin tuna) and International Whaling Commission (IWC), species under evaluation by the Fisheries Agency, smaller Cetaceans, and those already evaluated for the Red List.

With the renewed focus on evaluating the rarity or otherwise of marine life in line with the National Biodiversity Strategy 2012–2020, using the same evaluation criteria and categories as the Ministry of the Environment, and working in collaboration with the Ministry, the Fisheries Agency has also produced a Red List of marine resources and smaller Cetaceans, excluding species subject to international agreements, such as those in the remit of the WCPFC and IWC. Evaluations of 94 species were published in 2017, all falling outside the rankings (i.e., being of Least Concern), other than Pleuronichthys japonicus (Data Deficient).

The Red List (and Red Data Book) itself has no legal force but is intended to be used to provide information and to serve as a "warning to society". Appropriate action may be taken under the 1992 Conservation of Endangered Species of Wild Fauna and Flora Act [ja].

== Classification ==
As of the 2020 edition, thirteen taxa are used for classification purposes by the Ministry of the Environment:

- Fauna
  - Mammals (哺乳類)
  - Birds (鳥類)
  - Reptiles (爬虫類)
  - Amphibians (両生類)
  - Brackish and Freshwater Fish (汽水･淡水魚類)
  - Insects (昆虫類)
  - Molluscs (貝類)
  - Other Invertebrates (Arachnids, Crustaceans, etc.) (その他無脊椎動物（クモ形類、甲殻類等）)
- Flora
  - Vascular Plants (維管束植物)
  - Bryophytes (蘚苔類)
  - Algae (藻類)
  - Lichens (地衣類)
  - Fungi (菌類)

Five further taxa are used for the Marine Life Red List:

- Fish (魚類)
- Coral (サンゴ類)
- Crustaceans (甲殻類)
- Molluscs (Cephalopods) (軟体動物（頭足類）)
- Other Invertebrates (その他無脊椎動物)

The following categories are used to indicate organisms' conservation status specifically within Japan; where a species or subspecies is endemic, the status EX (Extinct) is indicative of its global status.

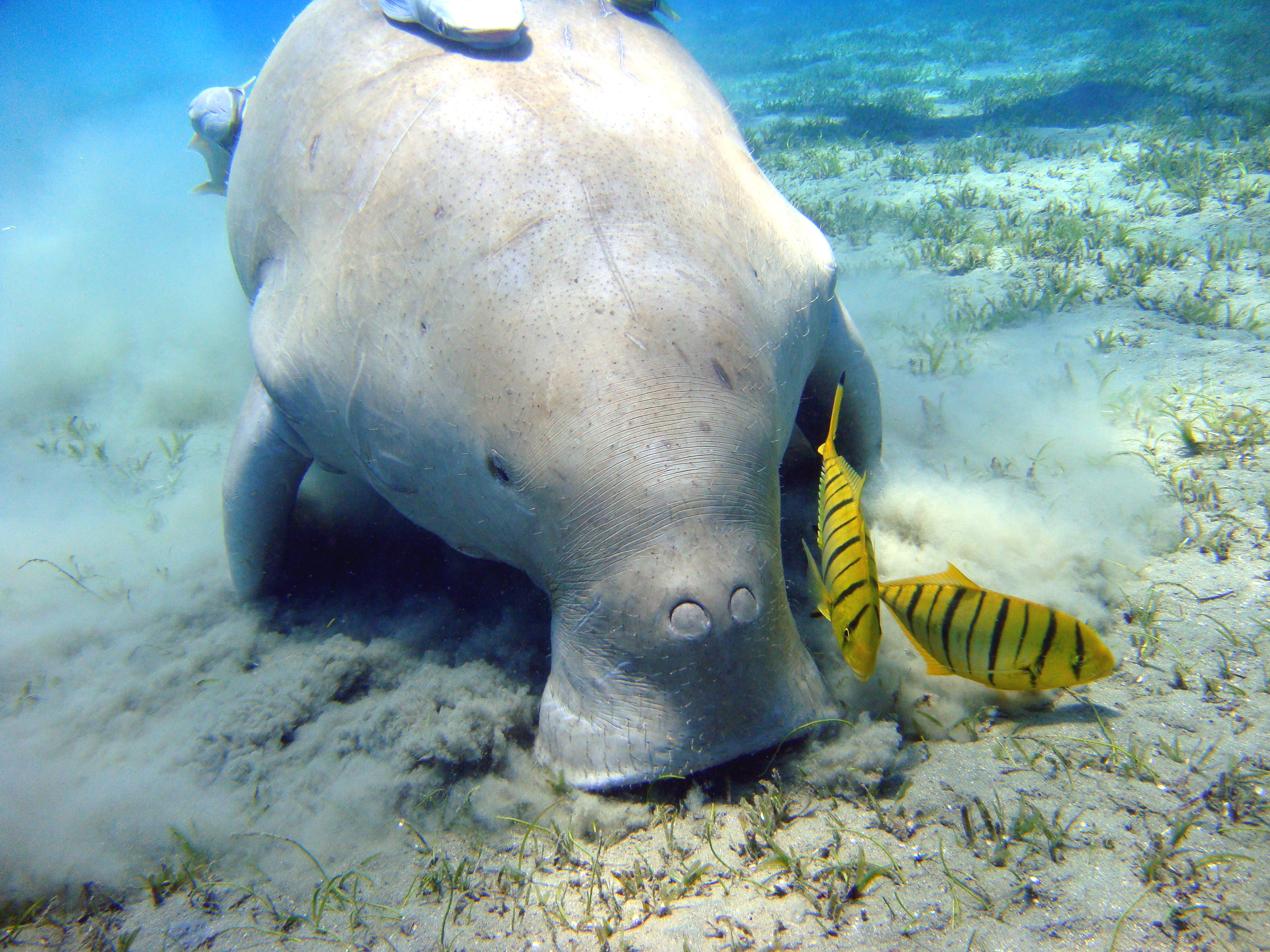
The dugong (dugong dugon) VU^{IUCN}, VU at a global level on the IUCN Red List, CR on the Japanese Red List; those found in the waters around northern Okinawa Island comprise the northernmost population globally and are protected as a Natural Monument under the 1950 Law for the Protection of Cultural Properties

Classification	Definition
絶滅 (EX)	Extinct in Japan
野生絶滅 (EW)	Extinct in the Wild
絶滅危惧I類 (CR+EN)	Threatened I
絶滅危惧IA類(CR)	Critically Endangered
絶滅危惧IB類(EN)	Endangered
絶滅危惧II類 (VU)	Threatened II—Vulnerable
準絶滅危惧 (NT)	Near-Threatened
情報不足(DD）	Data Deficient
絶滅のおそれのある地域個体群 (LP)	Local Population at high risk of extinction

== Statistics ==
Ministry of the Environment Red List 4.5 (2020) and Marine Life Red List 1.0 (2017)
	Taxon	Total	EX	EW	CR	EN	VU	NT	DD	LP
Fauna	Mammals	160	7	0	12	13	9	17	5	26
Fauna	Birds	c.700	15	0	24	31	43	22	17	2
Fauna	Reptiles	100	0	0	5	9	23	17	3	5
Fauna	Amphibians	91	0	0	5	20	22	19	1	0
Fauna	Brackish and Freshwater Fish	c.400	3	1	71	54	44	35	37	15
Fauna	Insects	c.32,000	4	0	75	107	185	351	153	2
Fauna	Molluscs	c.3,200	19	0	39	28	328	440	89	13
Fauna	Other Invertebrates	c.5,300	1	0	0	2	43	42	44	0
Flora	Vascular Plants	c.7,000	28	11	529	520	741	297	37	0
Flora	Bryophytes	c.1,800	0	0	137		103	21	21	0
Flora	Algae	c.3,000	4	1	95		21	41	40	0
Flora	Lichens	c.1,600	4	0	43		20	41	46	0
Flora	Fungi	c.3,000	25	1	37		24	21	51	0
Marine	Fish	c.3,900	0	0	8	6	2	89	112	2
Marine	Coral	c.690	1	0	0	1	5	7	1	0
Marine	Crustaceans	c.3,000	0	0	8	11	11	43	98	2
Marine	Molluscs	c.230	0	0	0	0	0	3	0	0
Marine	Other Invertebrates	c.2,300	0	0	1	2	1	20	13	1

=== Extinct taxa ===
- Mammals: Hokkaido wolf (Canis lupus hattai), Japanese wolf (Canis lupus hodophilax), Japanese river otter (Lutra lutra nippon), Hokkaido river otter (Lutra lutra whiteleyi), Okinawa flying fox (Pteropus loochoensis) DD^{IUCN}, Miyako little horseshoe bat (Rhinolophus pumilus miyakonis), Bonin pipistrelle (Pipistrellus sturdeei) EX^{IUCN}
- Birds: Crested shelduck (Tadorna cristata) CR^{IUCN}, Ryukyu wood pigeon (Columba jouyi) EX^{IUCN}, Bonin wood pigeon (Columba versicolor) EX^{IUCN}, Bonin nankeen night heron (Nycticorax caledonicus crassirostris) EX^{IUCN}, Iwo Jima rail (Porzana cinerea brevipes) EX^{IUCN}, Daito buzzard (Buteo buteo oshiroi), Ryukyu kingfisher (Todiramphus miyakoensis), Tristram's woodpecker (Dryocopus javensis richardsi), Izu Peregrine falcon (Falco peregrinus furuitii), Daito varied tit, (Poecile varius orii), Mukojima white-eye (Apalopteron familiare familiare), Daito wren (Troglodytes troglodytes orii), Bonin thrush (Cichlopasser terrestris) EX^{IUCN}, Southern Ryukyu robin (Luscinia komadori subrufus), Bonin grosbeak (Chaunoproctus ferreorostris) EX^{IUCN}
- Brackish and Freshwater Fish: Green sturgeon (Acipenser medirostris), Gnathopogon elongatus suwae, Amur stickleback (Pungitius kaibarae)
- Insects: Ishikawatrechus intermedius, Rakantrechus elegans, Prodaticus satoi [ja], Macroplea japana
- Molluscs: Ogasawarana chichijimana CR^{IUCN}, Ogasawarana habei CR^{IUCN}, Ogasawarana rex CR^{IUCN}, Assiminea sp. D, Hirasea diplomphalus latispira, Hirasea eutheca DD^{IUCN}, Hirasea goniobasis DD^{IUCN}, Hirasea hypolia DD^{IUCN}, Hirasea major DD^{IUCN}, Hirasea nesiotica liobasis, Hirasea planulata biconcava, Hirasea planulata planulata, Hirasea profundispira DD^{IUCN}, Hirasea sinuosa DD^{IUCN}, Hirasiella clara DD^{IUCN}, Lamprocystis hahajimana pachychilus, Trochochlamys ogasawarana CR^{IUCN}, Vitrinula chichijimana EX^{IUCN}, Vitrinula hahajimana EX^{IUCN}
- Other Invertebrates: Compressalges nipponiae
- Vascular Plants: Elatostema lineolatum var. majus, Ranunculus gmelinii, Rubus hatsushimae, Flemingia strobilifera, Lespedeza hisauchii, Euphrasia insignis insignis var. omiensis, Euphrasia insignis insignis var. pubigera, Euphrasia multifolia var. kirisimana, Cirsium toyoshimae, Aletris makiyataroi, Burmannia coelestris, Thismia tuberculata, Eriocaulon cauliferum, Cyperus diaphanus, Cyperus procerus, Fimbristylis leptoclada var. takamineana, Fimbristylis pauciflora, Acanthephippium striatum
- Algae: Chara fibrosa var. brevibracteata, Chara globularis var. hakonensis, Nitella minispora, Porphyra angusta
- Lichens: Erioderma tomentosum, Heterodermia angustiloba, Heterodermia leucomelos, Siphula ceratites
- Fungi: Agaricus hahashimensis, Albatrellus cantharellus, Camarophyllus microbicolor, Chlorophyllum agaricoides, Circulocolumella hahashimensis, Clitocybe castaneofloccosa, Collybia matris, Coprinus boninensis, Cyathus boninensis, Ganoderma colossus, Gymnopilus noviholocirrhus, Hygrocybe macrospora, Hygrocybe miniatostriata, Lactarius ogasawarashimensis, Lentinus lamelliporus, Lepiota boninensis, Leptoglossum boninense, Lycoperdon henningsii, Pleurotus cyatheae, Pluteus daidoi, Pluteus horridilamellus, Psathyrella boninensis, Pyrrhoglossum subpurpureum, Rhodophyllus brunneolus, Russula boninensis
- Coral: Merulina coral (Boninastrea boninensis) DD^{IUCN}

== Prefectural Red Lists ==
Localized Red Lists and Red Data are also prepared and published by a number of Prefectural Governments, including those of Hokkaidō and Okinawa.

== See also ==
- Natural Habitat Conservation Areas (Japan)
- Wildlife Protection Areas (Japan)
- Convention on Biological Diversity
- Wildlife of Japan
