= Opanara fosbergi =

Conservation status
- Critically Endangered (IUCN 2.3)

Scientific classification
- Kingdom: Animalia
- Phylum: Mollusca
- Class: Gastropoda
- Order: Stylommatophora
- Family: Endodontidae
- Genus: Opanara
- Species: O. fosbergi

Binomial name
- Opanara fosbergi Solem, 1976

Species of gastropod

Opanara fosbergi is a species of small air-breathing land snail, a terrestrial pulmonate gastropod mollusk in the family Charopidae. This species is endemic to French Polynesia.
