= Cookeconcha hystricella =

Scientific classification
- Kingdom: Animalia
- Phylum: Mollusca
- Class: Gastropoda
- Order: Stylommatophora
- Family: Endodontidae
- Genus: Cookeconcha
- Species: C. hystricella

Binomial name
- Cookeconcha hystricella (L. Pfeiffer, 1859)

Synonyms
- Cookeconcha hystricellus (L. Pfeiffer, 1859) incorrect grammatical agreement of specific epithet; Endodonta hystricella (L. Pfeiffer, 1859) superseded combination; Helix hystricella L. Pfeiffer, 1859 superseded combination

Species of land snail

Cookeconcha hystricella is a species of small air-breathing land snails, terrestrial pulmonate gastropod mollusks in the family Endodontidae. It is endemic to Hawaii.

== Description ==
The shell of Cookeconcha hystricella is typically brown to dark brown and is characterized by a spiny or bristled texture, which distinguishes it from other land snails. The shell is very small, measuring only a few millimeters in diameter, varying between 5.5 mm and 6 mm, while its length attains 2.5 mm.

The shell is umbilicate and discoidal, rather thin, and somewhat closely ribbed and plicate, irregularly rayed with whitish and reddish coloration. The spire is flat or sunken at the center. There are six whorls, swollen below the suture, the body whorl being rounded and not descending. The umbilicus occupies one quarter of the shell’s diameter. The aperture is oblique and rounded-lunate, constricted by six sharp lamellae — two equal ones on the ventral surface of the penultimate whorl, and four on the basal and right margins. The peristome is simple and straight.

== Distribution and habitat ==
Cookeconcha hystricella is endemic to the island of Hawaii where it is restricted to native forest ecosystems. Historical records indicate that the species inhabited humid to wet forest habitats where high environmental moisture supports terrestrial gastropod survival. It is typically found within leaf litter and low vegetation in the forest understory.

== Conservation ==
Due to its limited range and dependence on native forest habitats Cookeconcha hystricella is considered vulnerable. Conservation efforts in Hawaii focus on habitat protection predator control and monitoring of remaining populations. Extensive surveys have failed to find additional species or populations in this family as it has been nearly extirpated from the islands.
