= Macroplea pubipennis =

Scientific classification
- Kingdom: Animalia
- Phylum: Arthropoda
- Class: Insecta
- Order: Coleoptera
- Suborder: Polyphaga
- Infraorder: Cucujiformia
- Family: Chrysomelidae
- Genus: Macroplea
- Species: M. pubipennis

Binomial name
- Macroplea pubipennis (Reuter, 1875)

Species of beetle

Macroplea pubipennis is a species of leaf beetle of the subfamily Donaciinae that is endemic to Finland.

== Description ==
The species are 6–7 millimetres (0.24–0.28 in) in length and are straw-coloured. They also have long legs and antennae. The only differences between this species and Macroplea mutica is the shape of the elytral apex and male genitalia. They are underwater species, and live at depths of 25–50 centimetres (10–20 in).

== Distribution ==
The species could be found in the Baltic Sea and from Gulf of Finland to the Bothnian Bay. So far, only two places where the species were found are known: Gulf of Finland and Archipelago Sea. Outside of Finland the species are not common.

== Ecology ==
The species usually feed on aquatic plants, such as Myriophyllum, Potamogeton and Zannichellia.

== Threat level and its factors ==
The species are considered to be under VU status in Finland and is currently under protection of Nature Conservation Decree. They are threatened due to the construction and dredging, disturbances that are caused by boats. Also, by invasion of reeds that are unwelcome to such species, they are losing their taste for vegetation.
