= Thaumatodon multilamellata =

Conservation status
- Extinct (yes) (IUCN 2.3)

Scientific classification
- Kingdom: Animalia
- Phylum: Mollusca
- Class: Gastropoda
- Order: Stylommatophora
- Family: Endodontidae
- Genus: Thaumatodon
- Species: †T. multilamellata

Binomial name
- †Thaumatodon multilamellata Garrett, 1887

Species of gastropod

Thaumatodon multilamellata was a species of small air-breathing land snail, a terrestrial pulmonate gastropod mollusk in the family Endodontidae. This species was endemic to (found only in) the Cook Islands, but it now appears to be extinct.
