= Cookeconcha contorta =

Conservation status
- Critically Endangered (IUCN 2.3)

Scientific classification
- Kingdom: Animalia
- Phylum: Mollusca
- Class: Gastropoda
- Order: Stylommatophora
- Family: Endodontidae
- Genus: Cookeconcha
- Species: C. contorta

Binomial name
- Cookeconcha contorta (Férussac, 1825)

Synonyms
- Cookeconcha sp. (Férussac, 1825)

Species of gastropod

Cookeconcha contorta is a species of very small, air-breathing land snail, a terrestrial pulmonate gastropod mollusk in the family Endodontidae.

== Distribution ==
This species is found only in Hawaii, and is threatened by habitat loss.
