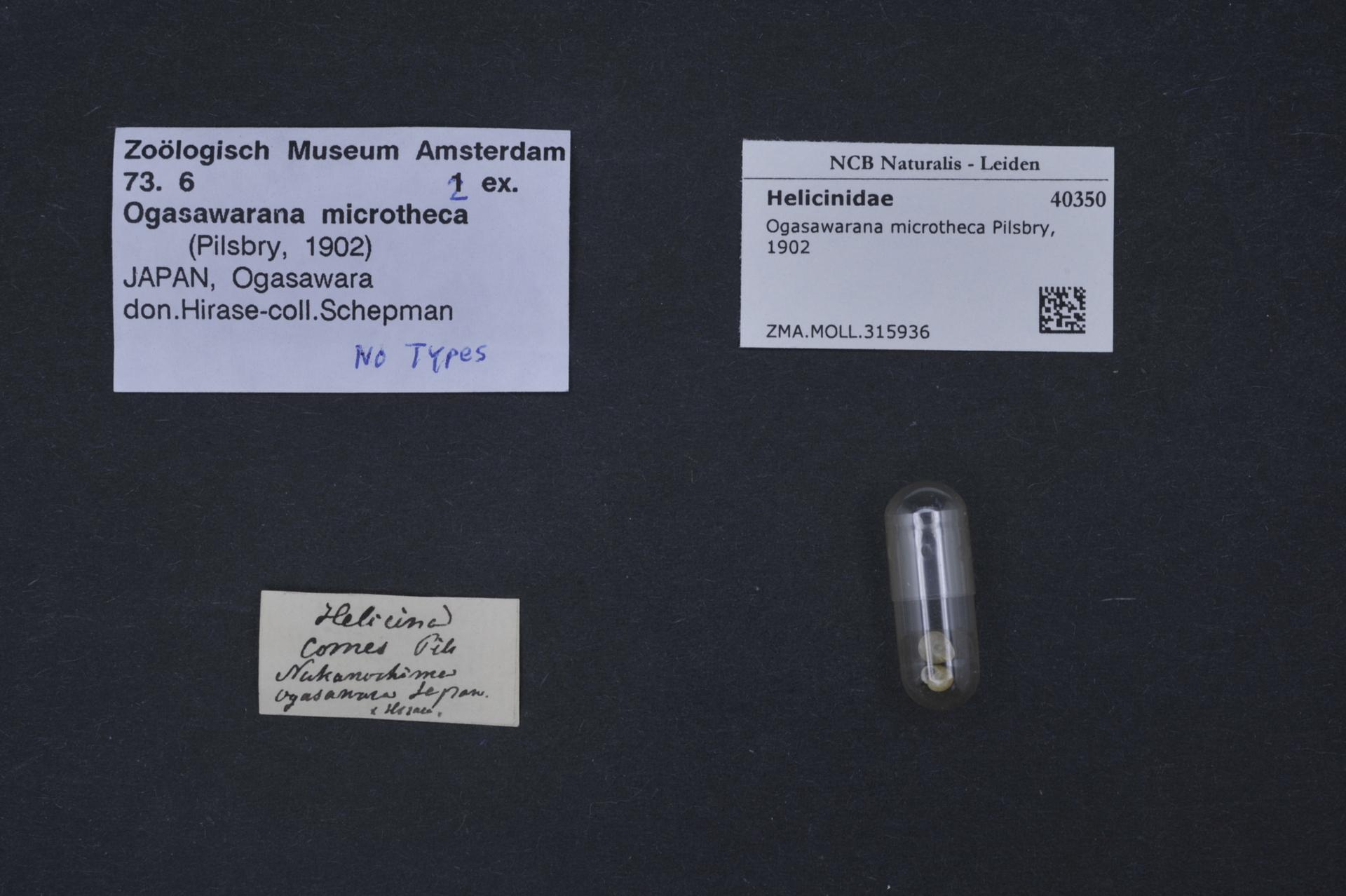
- Ogasawarana microtheca

Scientific classification
- Kingdom: Animalia
- Phylum: Mollusca
- Class: Gastropoda
- Order: Cycloneritida
- Family: Helicinidae
- Genus: Ogasawarana; A. J. Wagner, 1905

= Ogasawarana =

Genus of gastropods

Ogasawarana is a genus of land snails with an operculum, terrestrial gastropod mollusk in the family Helicinidae, the helicinids.

== Species ==
Species within the genus Ogasawarana include:

- Ogasawarana arata
- Ogasawarana capsula
- Ogasawarana chichijimana (Kuroda, 1956)
- Ogasawarana comes
- Ogasawarana discrepans
- Ogasawarana habei
- Ogasawarana hirasei
- Ogasawarana metamorpha (Kuroda, 1956)
- Ogasawarana microtheca
- Ogasawarana nitida
- Ogasawarana obtusa†
- Ogasawarana ogasawarana (Pilsbry, 1902)
- Ogasawarana optima
- Ogasawarana rex (A.J. Wagner, 1909)
- Ogasawarana yoshiwarana
