= Endodonta apiculata =

Conservation status
- Critically Endangered (IUCN 2.3)

Scientific classification
- Kingdom: Animalia
- Phylum: Mollusca
- Class: Gastropoda
- Order: Stylommatophora
- Family: Endodontidae
- Genus: Endodonta
- Species: E. apiculata

Binomial name
- Endodonta apiculata (Ancey, 1889)

Synonyms
- Endodonta sp. (Ancey 1889)

Species of gastropod

Endodonta apiculata is a species of small air-breathing land snail, a terrestrial pulmonate gastropod mollusc in the family Endodontidae, an endemic family of land snails from the Hawaiian islands.

== Conservation status ==
This species is critically endangered and may perhaps already be extinct, mainly because of habitat loss due to human development.

== Distribution ==
It is (or was) found only in Kauai, Hawaii, United States.
