= Nesophila =

Nesophila may refer to:

- Nesophila (gastropod), a genus of gastropods in the family Endodontidae
- Nesophila (alga), a genus of red algae in the family Rhizophyllidaceae
- Nesophila, a genus of butterflies in the family Geometridae, synonym of Solomonophila
