= Endodonta christenseni =

Scientific classification
- Kingdom: Animalia
- Phylum: Mollusca
- Class: Gastropoda
- Order: Stylommatophora
- Family: Endodontidae
- Genus: Endodonta
- Species: E. christenseni

Binomial name
- Endodonta christenseni Slapcinsky, Yeung & Hayes, 2020

Species of mollusc

Endodonta christenseni is a terrestrial snail species belonging to the family Endodontidae. First recorded in 1923, but not formally described until 2020, the species is endemic to the island of Nīhoa, Hawaii.

== Description ==
The shell of Endodonta christenseni is lenticular, about 2.3 mm tall and 4.7 mm wide, with an umbilicate structure. Its trapezoidal aperture is partly blocked by 7–10 lamellar barriers. The shell color ranges from yellow-brown to reddish-brown with irregular patterns. It feeds on fungi, aiding spore dispersal, and helps break down leaf litter. They also provide a food source for birds.

== Distribution and habitat ==
Endodonta christenseni is endemic to the island of Nīhoa, Hawaii. The species lives primarily in clumps on the plant Eragrostis variabilis.

== Cultural significance ==
Endodonta christenseni is culturally significant in Hawaii. The species is one of Hawaii's nine state snails.
