= O. rex =

O. rex may refer to:

- Oecomys rex, the regal oecomys or king arboreal rice rat, a rodent species found in Guyana, Suriname, French Guiana and nearby parts of Venezuela and Brazil
- Ogasawarana rex, a land snail species endemic to Japan
- Othnielia rex, a hypsilophodont dinosaur species

== See also ==
- Rex (disambiguation)
