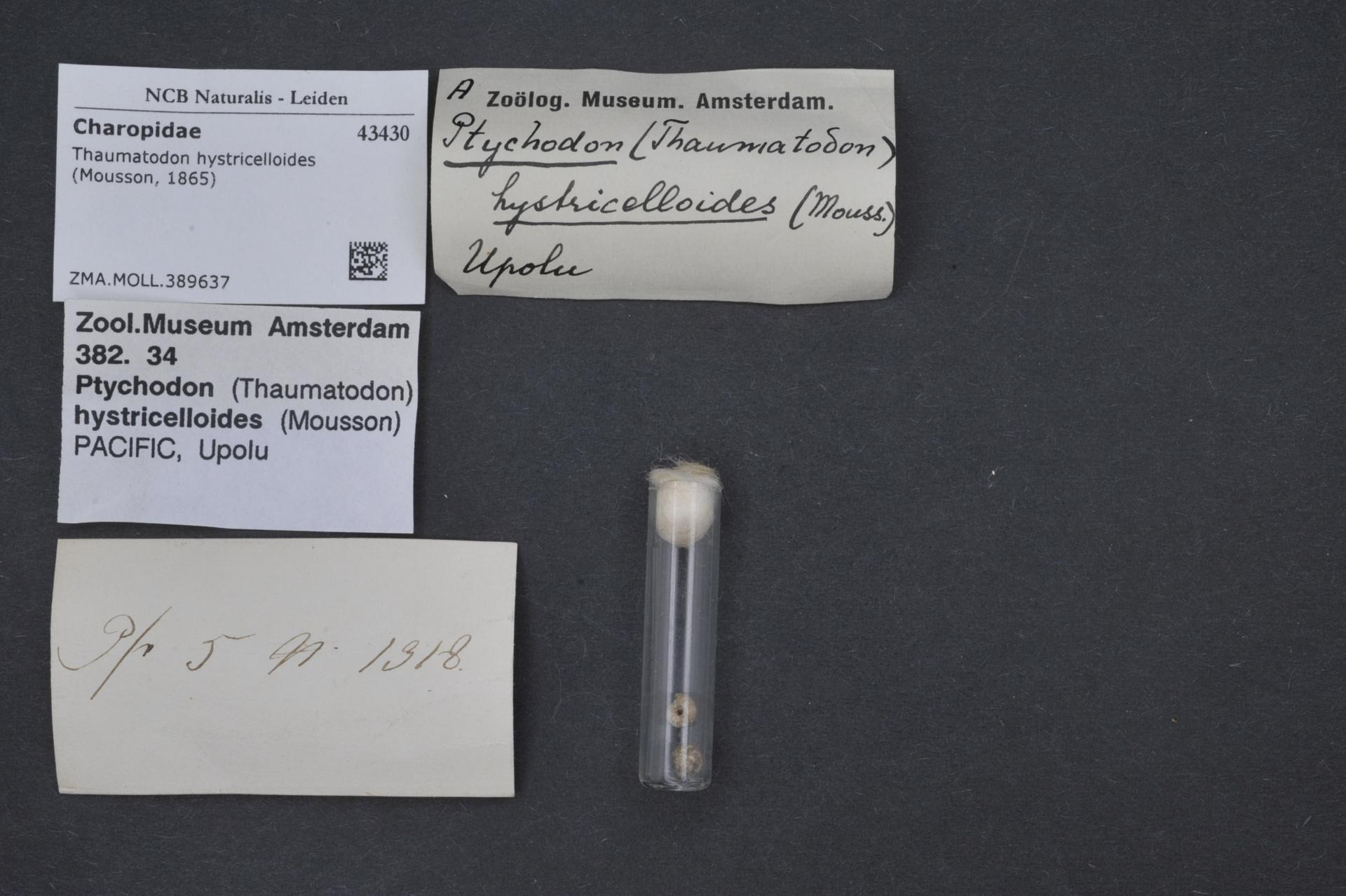

Conservation status
- Endangered (IUCN 2.3)

Scientific classification
- Kingdom: Animalia
- Phylum: Mollusca
- Class: Gastropoda
- Order: Stylommatophora
- Family: Endodontidae
- Genus: Thaumatodon
- Species: T. hystricelloides

Binomial name
- Thaumatodon hystricelloides Mousson, 1865

= Thaumatodon hystricelloides =

Species of gastropod

Thaumatodon hystricelloides is a species of small air-breathing land snail, a terrestrial pulmonate gastropod mollusk in the family Endodontidae.

This species is endemic to Samoa; it is an endangered species.
