= Ogasawarana obtusa =

Scientific classification
- Kingdom: Animalia
- Phylum: Mollusca
- Class: Gastropoda
- Order: Cycloneritida
- Family: Helicinidae
- Genus: Ogasawarana; A. J. Wagner, 1905
- Species: O. obtusa

Binomial name
- Ogasawarana obtusa Chiba, Sasaki, Suzuki & Horikoshi, 2008

Extinct species of gastropod

Ogasawarana obtusa is an extinct species of snail from Chichi-jima, Ogasawara, Japan. The holotype and paratypes are from 720 years BP. The shell is 4.9 to 5.3 millimetres (0.19 to 0.21 in) in diameter and 2.7 to 2.8 millimetres (0.11 to 0.11 in) in height. It has approximately 3.5 whorls. The surface of the shell is smooth, with fine growth lines and no spiral lines.
