= Ruatara =

Ruatara may refer to:

- Ruatara (chief) (c. 1787–1815), a chief of the Ngāpuhi iwi in New Zealand
- Ruatara (gastropod), a member of the family Charopidae
