= Hirasea chichijimana =

Conservation status
- Endangered (IUCN 2.3)

Scientific classification
- Kingdom: Animalia
- Phylum: Mollusca
- Class: Gastropoda
- Order: Stylommatophora
- Family: Charopidae
- Genus: Hirasea
- Species: H. chichijimana

Binomial name
- Hirasea chichijimana Pilsbry, 1902

Species of gastropod

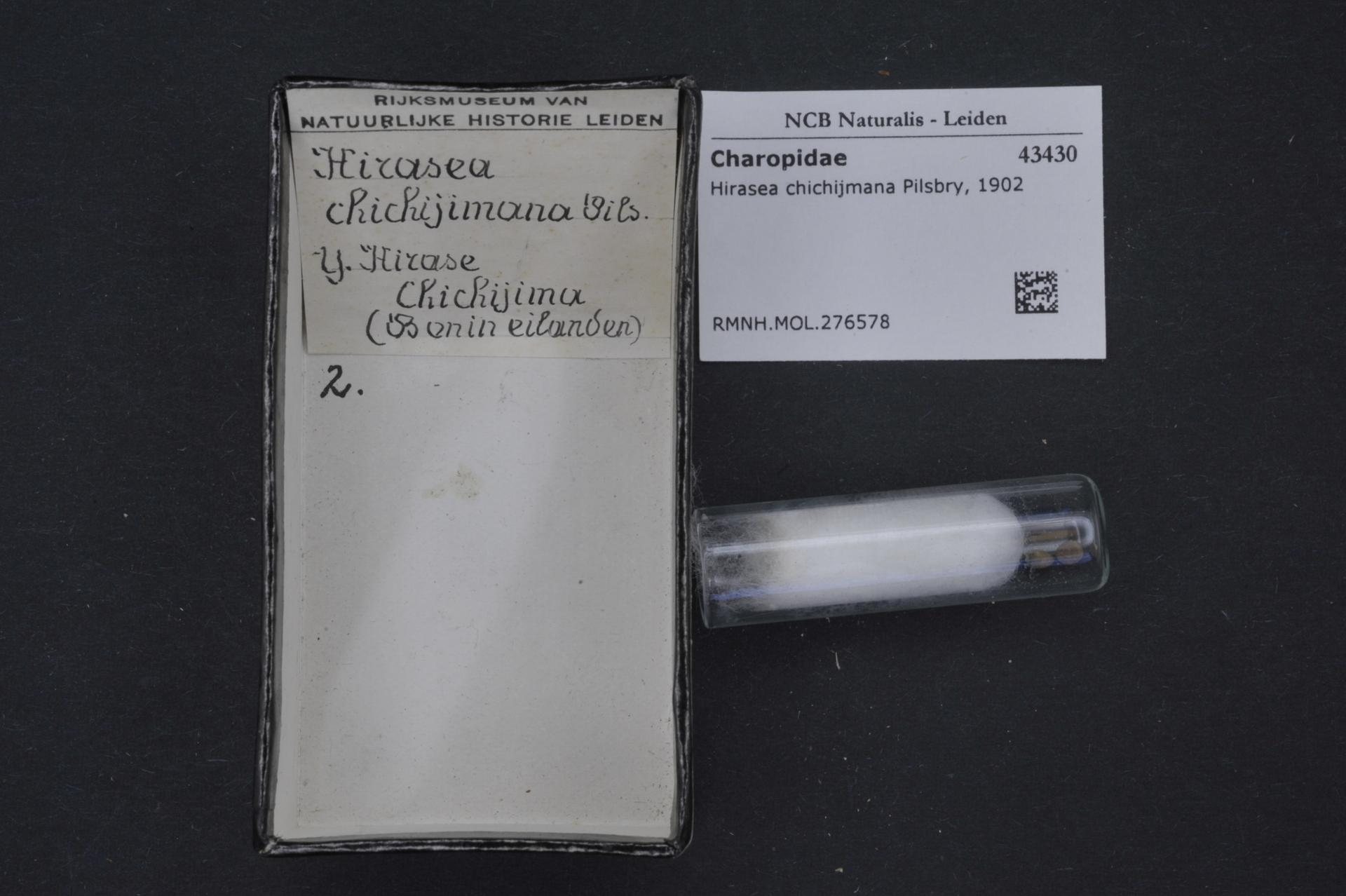
A specimen of Hirasea chichijimana preserved at the Naturalis Biodiversity Center (RMNH.MOL.276578), collected in 1902

Hirasea chichijimana is a species of small air-breathing land snail, a terrestrial pulmonate gastropod mollusc in the family Endodontidae.

The width of the shell is 1.5 mm. The height of the shell is 3 mm. This is an endangered species.

== Distribution ==
This species (and indeed the whole genus) is endemic to Japan.
