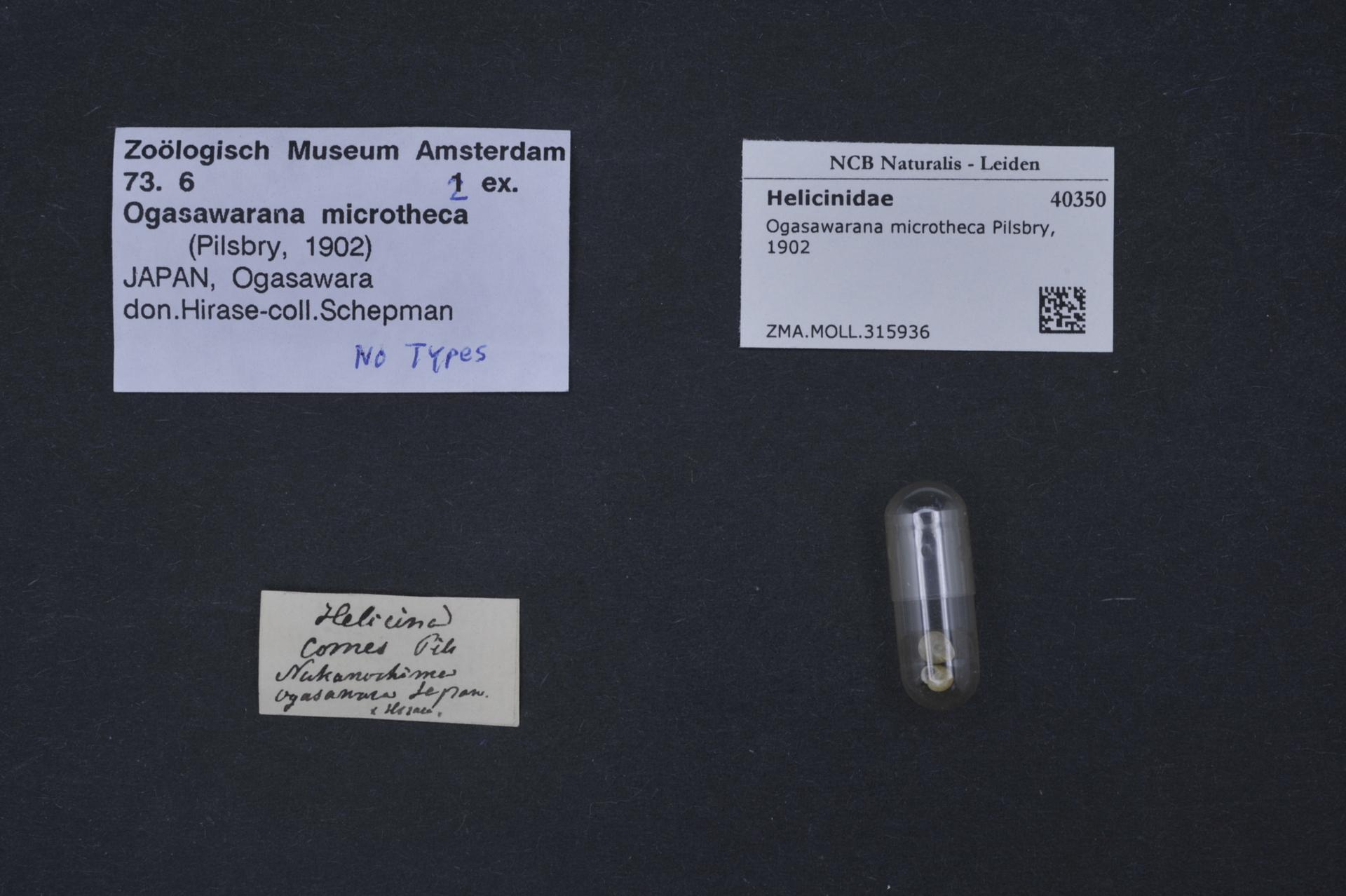
- Ogasawarana microtheca Pilsbry, 1902

Conservation status
- Data Deficient (IUCN 2.3)

Scientific classification
- Kingdom: Animalia
- Phylum: Mollusca
- Class: Gastropoda
- Order: Cycloneritida
- Family: Helicinidae
- Genus: Ogasawarana
- Species: O. microtheca

Binomial name
- Ogasawarana microtheca (Pilsbry, 1902)

= Ogasawarana microtheca =

Species of gastropod

Ogasawarana microtheca is a species of land snail with an operculum, a terrestrial gastropod mollusk in the family Helicinidae, the helicinids.

== Distribution ==
This species is endemic to Japan.
