= Hirasea acutissima =

Conservation status
- Endangered (IUCN 2.3)

Scientific classification
- Kingdom: Animalia
- Phylum: Mollusca
- Class: Gastropoda
- Order: Stylommatophora
- Family: Charopidae
- Genus: Hirasea
- Species: H. acutissima

Binomial name
- Hirasea acutissima Tomiyama, 1996

Species of gastropod

Hirasea acutissima is a species of small air-breathing land snail, a terrestrial pulmonate gastropod mollusk in the family Charopidae. The width of the shell is 2 mm. The height of the shell is 4 mm. H. acutissima is endemic to Haha-jima in the Ogasawara Islands, Japan, and is listed as endangered in the IUCN Red List of Threatened Species. In 2007, the species was rediscovered after being considered to be extinct.
