= Ogasawarana ogasawarana =

Conservation status
- Data Deficient (IUCN 2.3)

Scientific classification
- Kingdom: Animalia
- Phylum: Mollusca
- Class: Gastropoda
- Order: Cycloneritida
- Family: Helicinidae
- Genus: Ogasawarana
- Species: O. ogasawarana

Binomial name
- Ogasawarana ogasawarana (Pilsbry, 1902)

Synonyms
- Kaliella ogasawarana Pilsbry, 1902

Species of gastropod

Ogasawarana ogasawarana is a species of land snail with an operculum, a terrestrial gastropod mollusk in the family Helicinidae, the helicinids.

== Distribution ==
This species is endemic to Japan.

== Description ==
Ogasawarana ogasawarana was originally described under the name Kaliella ogasawarana by American malacologist Henry Augustus Pilsbry in 1902.

Pilsbry's original text (the type description) appeared in the key and it reads as follows:

Shell large for the genus, subperforate, conic, pale yellowish-corneous, subtransparent, glossy, smooth except for slight growth-lines. Spire almost straightly conic, the apex obtuse. Whorls 7½, somewhat convex, the last strongly angular at the periphery, moderately convex below. Aperture slightly curved, in crescent form, truncate at the ends; lip thin and acute, the columella concave, with narrowly reflexed margin. Alt. 5, diam. 5 mm. Hahajima, Ogasawara (Y. Hirase, No. 846).
