= Ogasawarana arata =

Conservation status
- Data Deficient (IUCN 2.3)

Scientific classification
- Kingdom: Animalia
- Phylum: Mollusca
- Class: Gastropoda
- Order: Cycloneritida
- Family: Helicinidae
- Genus: Ogasawarana
- Species: O. arata

Binomial name
- Ogasawarana arata Pilsbry, 1902

Species of gastropod

Ogasawarana arata is a species of land snail, a terrestrial gastropod mollusk in the family Helicinidae. This species is endemic to Japan.
