= Macroplea japana =

Scientific classification
- Kingdom: Animalia
- Phylum: Arthropoda
- Class: Insecta
- Order: Coleoptera
- Suborder: Polyphaga
- Infraorder: Cucujiformia
- Family: Chrysomelidae
- Genus: Macroplea
- Species: M. japana

Binomial name
- Macroplea japana (Jacoby, 1885)

Synonyms
- Haemonia japana Jacoby, 1885

Species of beetle

Macroplea japana is a species of beetle from the family of leaf beetles of the subfamily Donaciinae. Beetle is up to 6 mm. in length. It was previously considered to be a subspecies of Macroplea mutica.

== Distribution ==
The beetle can be found in Asian countries like Japan, and Primorsky krai of Russia. It considered to be a native species of Asia, Australia, Europe, and North America. In North America it is considered to be an invasive species since the 1950s.
