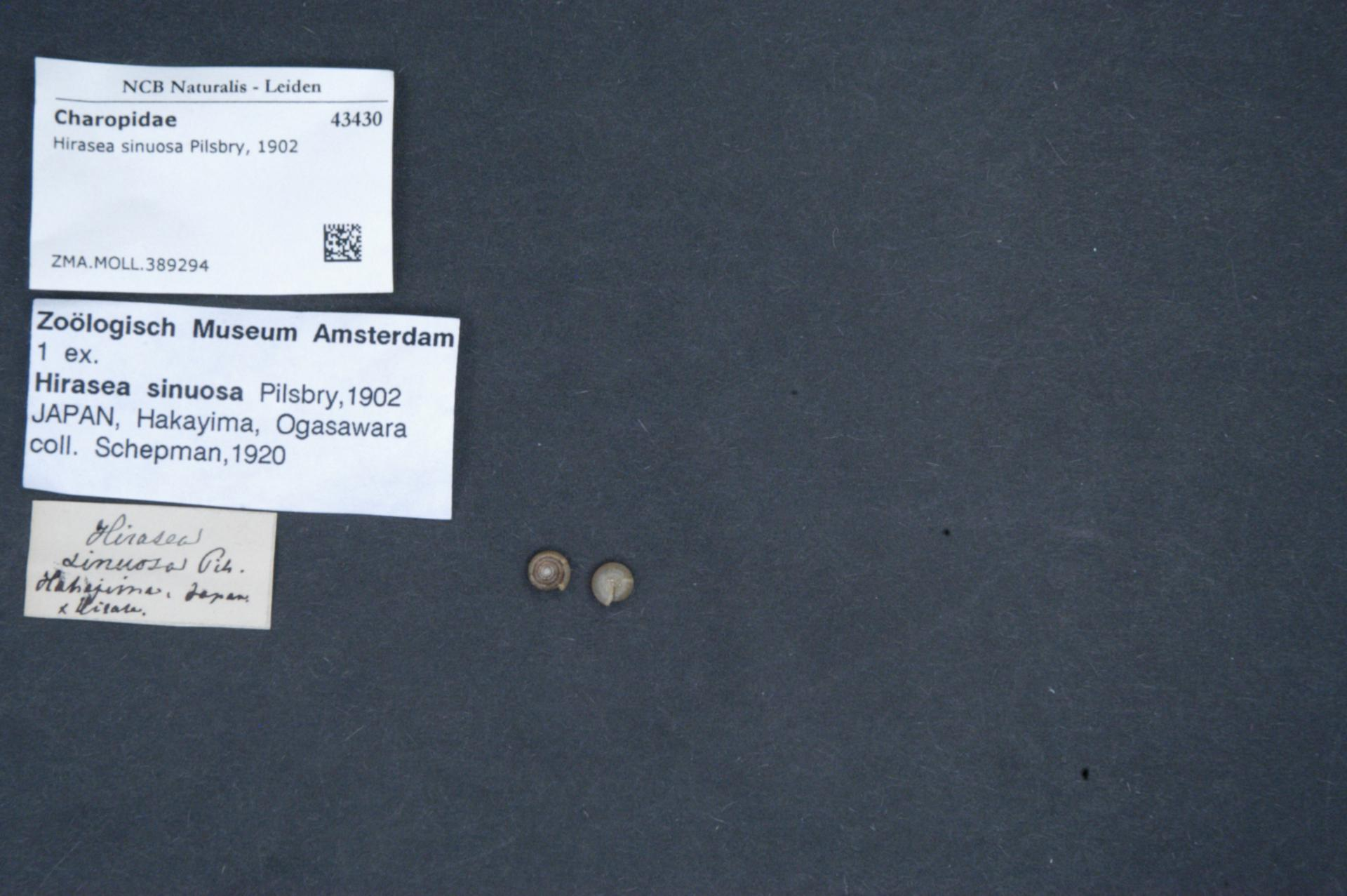
- Hirasea sinuosa shells

Scientific classification
- Kingdom: Animalia
- Phylum: Mollusca
- Class: Gastropoda
- Order: Stylommatophora
- Family: Charopidae
- Subfamily: Thysanotinae
- Genus: Hirasea; Pilsbry, 1902

= Hirasea =

Genus of gastropods

Hirasea is a genus of small, pulmonate land snails in the family Charopidae. This genus sees its highest diversity in the Hawaiian Islands, but species are distributed throughout Japan and Polynesia.

== Species ==
The following species are recognised in the genus Hirasea:

- Hirasea acuta
- Hirasea acutissima
- Hirasea biconcava
- Hirasea chichijimana
- Hirasea diplomphalus
- Hirasea eutheca
- Hirasea goniobasis
- Hirasea hypolia
- Hirasea insignis
- Hirasea major
- Hirasea nesiotica
- Hirasea planulata
- Hirasea profundispira
- Hirasea sinuosa
