= Opanara =

Scientific classification
- Kingdom: Animalia
- Phylum: Mollusca
- Class: Gastropoda
- Order: Stylommatophora
- Family: Endodontidae
- Genus: Opanara; Solem, 1976

Genus of gastropods

Opanara is a genus of small air-breathing land snails, terrestrial pulmonate gastropod mollusks in the family Endodontidae.

== Species ==
Species within the genus Opanara include:

- Opanara altiapica
- Opanara areaensis
- Opanara bitridentata
- Opanara caliculata
- Opanara depasoapicata
- Opanara duplicidentata
- Opanara fosbergi
- Opanara megomphala
- Opanara perahuensis
