= Hirasea goniobasis =

Conservation status
- Data Deficient (IUCN 2.3)

Scientific classification
- Kingdom: Animalia
- Phylum: Mollusca
- Class: Gastropoda
- Order: Stylommatophora
- Family: Charopidae
- Genus: Hirasea
- Species: H. goniobasis

Binomial name
- Hirasea goniobasis Pilsbry, 1902

Species of gastropod

Hirasea goniobasis is a species of small air-breathing land snail, a terrestrial pulmonate gastropod mollusk in the family Endodontidae.

This is an endangered species.

== Distribution ==
This species (and indeed the whole genus) is endemic to Japan.
