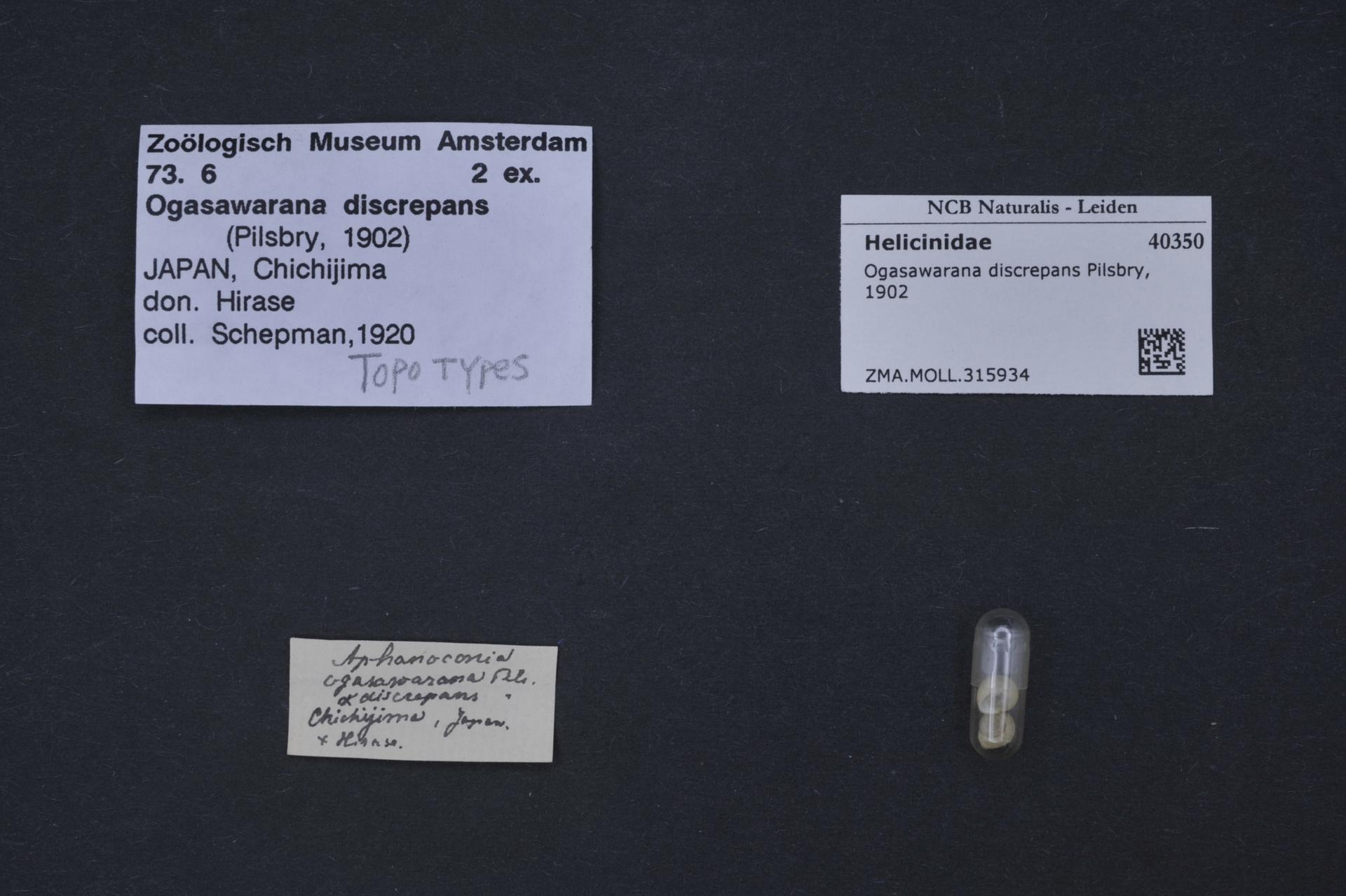
- Ogasawarana discrepans

Conservation status
- Data Deficient (IUCN 2.3)

Scientific classification
- Kingdom: Animalia
- Phylum: Mollusca
- Class: Gastropoda
- Order: Cycloneritida
- Family: Helicinidae
- Genus: Ogasawarana
- Species: O. discrepans

Binomial name
- Ogasawarana discrepans Pilsbry, 1902

= Ogasawarana discrepans =

Species of gastropod

Ogasawarana discrepans is a species of land snail with an operculum, a terrestrial gastropod mollusk in the family Helicinidae, the helicinids.

== Distribution ==
This species is endemic to Japan.
