= Hirasea planulata =

Conservation status
- Extinct (yes) (IUCN 2.3)

Scientific classification
- Kingdom: Animalia
- Phylum: Mollusca
- Class: Gastropoda
- Order: Stylommatophora
- Family: Charopidae
- Genus: Hirasea
- Species: †H. planulata

Binomial name
- †Hirasea planulata Pilsbry & Y. Hirase, 1903

Species of gastropod

Hirasea planulata is a species of small air-breathing land snail, a terrestrial pulmonate gastropod mollusc in the family Endodontidae.

This species is extinct.

== Distribution ==
This species was endemic to Japan.
