= Kondoconcha othnius =

Conservation status
- Critically Endangered (IUCN 2.3)

Scientific classification
- Kingdom: Animalia
- Phylum: Mollusca
- Class: Gastropoda
- Order: Stylommatophora
- Family: Charopidae
- Genus: Kondoconcha
- Species: K. othnius

Binomial name
- Kondoconcha othnius Solem, 1976

Species of gastropod

Kondoconcha othnius is a species of small air-breathing land snails, terrestrial pulmonate gastropod mollusks in the family Charopidae. This species is endemic to French Polynesia.
