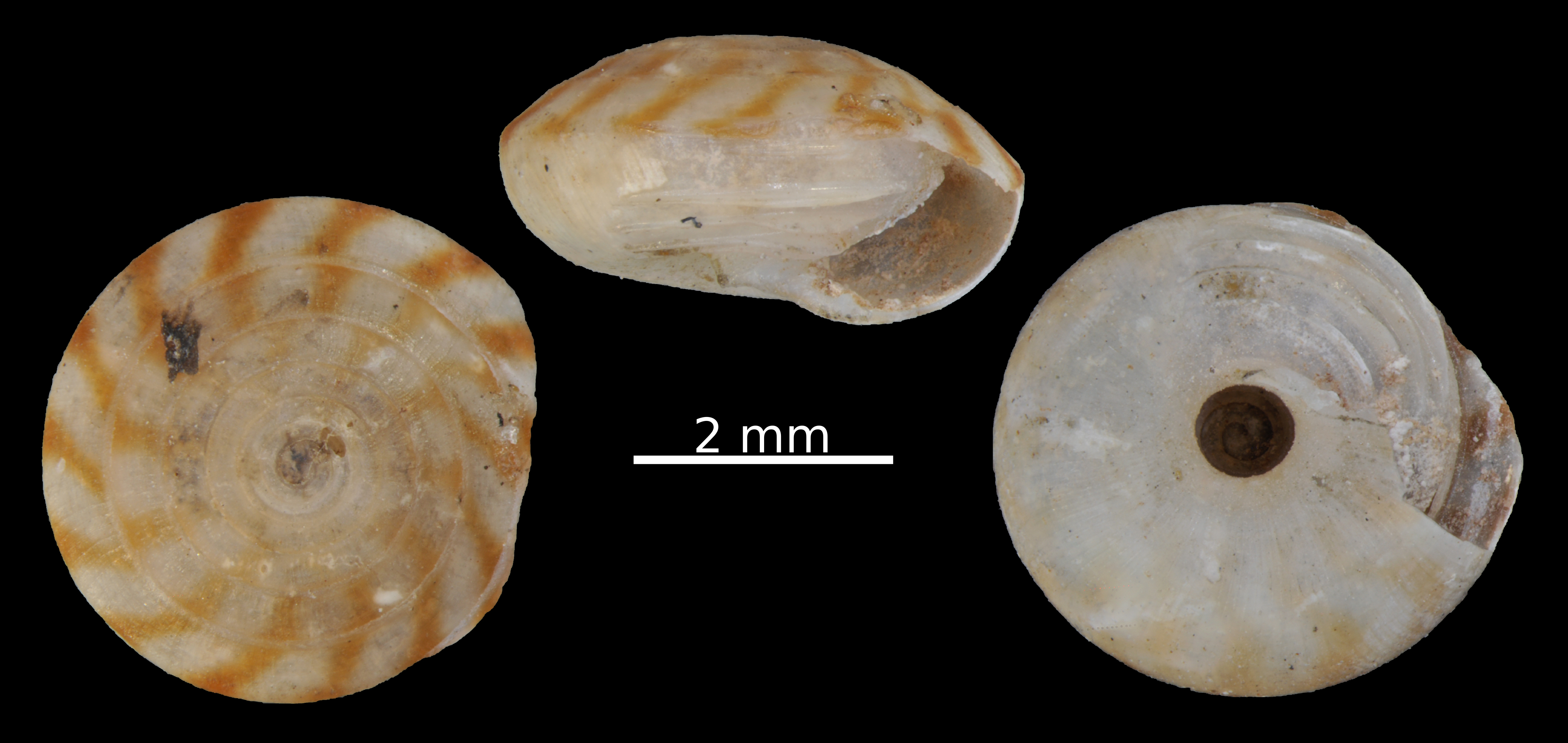
- Shell of Kleokyphus callimus (paratype at MNHN, Paris)

Scientific classification
- Kingdom: Animalia
- Phylum: Mollusca
- Class: Gastropoda
- Order: Stylommatophora
- Infraorder: incertae sedis
- Superfamily: Punctoidea
- Family: Endodontidae
- Genus: Kleokyphus; Solem, 1976

Type species
- Kleokyphus callimus Solem, 1976

= Kleokyphus =

Genus of gastropods

Kleokyphus is a genus of small air-breathing land snails, terrestrial pulmonate gastropod mollusks in the family Endodontidae, an endemic family of land snails from the Hawaiian islands.

== Species ==
- Kleokyphus callimus Solem, 1976
- Kleokyphus hypsus Solem, 1976
