= Macroplea ranina =

Scientific classification
- Kingdom: Animalia
- Phylum: Arthropoda
- Clade: Pancrustacea
- Class: Insecta
- Order: Coleoptera
- Suborder: Polyphaga
- Infraorder: Cucujiformia
- Family: Chrysomelidae
- Subfamily: Donaciinae
- Tribe: Haemoniini
- Genus: Macroplea
- Species: M. ranina

Binomial name
- Macroplea ranina Lou & Yu, 2011
- Type locality: Zoigê County, Sichuan Province, at 3454 m

Species of water beetle

Macroplea ranina is a species of water beetle in the subfamily Donaciinae of the Chrysomelidae family, and was first described in 2011 by three Chinese entomologists, Qiaozhe Lou, Yu Peiyu and Hongbin Liang. The species epithet, ranina, derives from the name, Ranidae, a family of frogs, because the beetle was first collected from the stomach of such a frog.

The larval host species is Hippuris vulgaris.

This species of beetle is found in China, in Sichuan Province.
