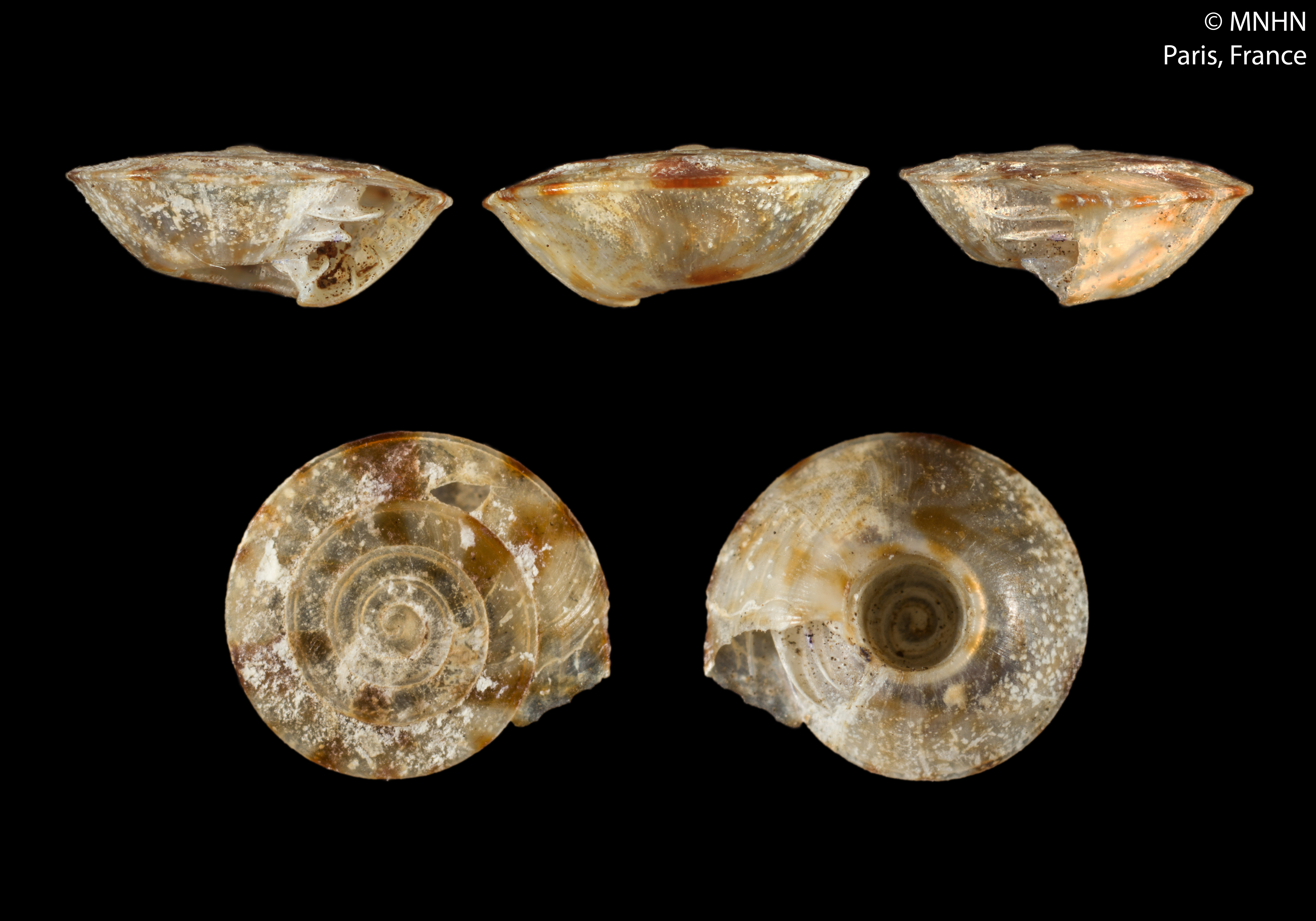
- Shell of Endodonta lamellosa (syntype at MNHN, Paris)

Scientific classification
- Kingdom: Animalia
- Phylum: Mollusca
- Class: Gastropoda
- Order: Stylommatophora
- Infraorder: incertae sedis
- Superfamily: Punctoidea
- Family: Endodontidae
- Genus: Endodonta; Albers, 1850

Type species
- Helix lamellosa Férussac, 1824

Synonyms
- Helix (Endodonta) Albers, 1850

= Endodonta =

Genus of gastropods

Endodonta is a genus of small air-breathing land snails, terrestrial pulmonate gastropod mollusks in the family Endodontidae, an endemic family of land snails from the Hawaiian islands.

== Species ==
Species within the genus Endodonta include:

- Endodonta apiculata (Ancey 1899)
- Endodonta binaria (L. Pfeiffer, 1856)
- Endodonta christenseni Slapcinsky, Yeung & Hayes, 2020
- Endodonta concentrata (Pilsbry & Vanatta, 1905)
- Endodonta ekahanuiensis (Solem, 1976)
- Endodonta fricki (L. Pfeiffer, 1858)
- Endodonta kalaeloana Christensen, 1982
- Endodonta kamehameha (Pilsbry & Vanatta, 1905)
- Endodonta lamellosa (Férussac, 1824)
- Endodonta laminata (Pease, 1866)
- Endodonta marsupialis Pilsbry & Vanatta, 1905
- Endodonta rugata (Pease, 1866)
