= Rhysoconcha atanuiensis =

Conservation status
- Vulnerable (IUCN 2.3)

Scientific classification
- Kingdom: Animalia
- Phylum: Mollusca
- Class: Gastropoda
- Order: Stylommatophora
- Family: Charopidae
- Genus: Rhysoconcha
- Species: R. atanuiensis

Binomial name
- Rhysoconcha atanuiensis Solem, 1976

Species of gastropod

Rhysoconcha atanuiensis is a species of small air-breathing land snail, a terrestrial pulmonate gastropod mollusk in the family Charopidae. This species is endemic to French Polynesia.
