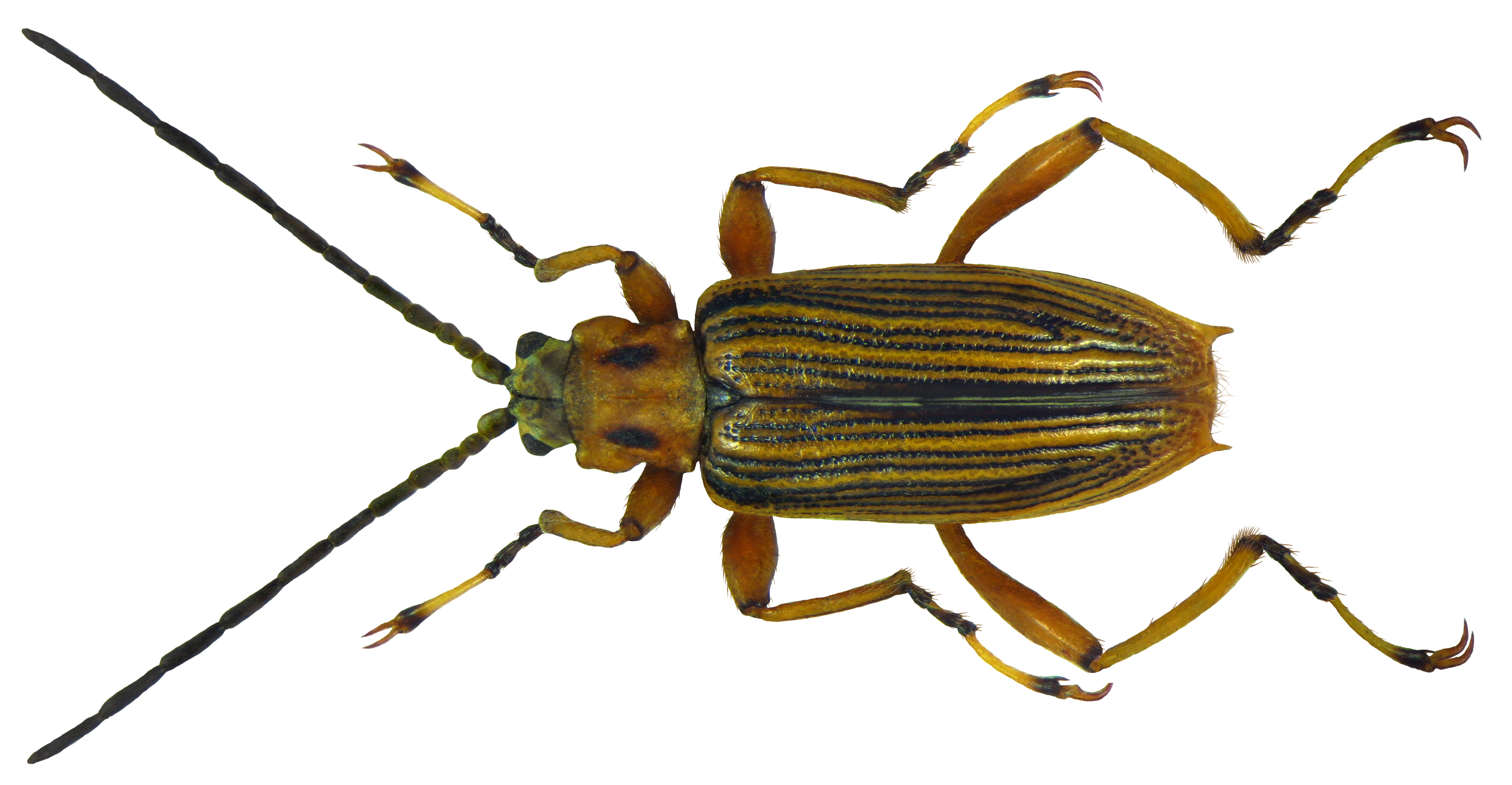

Scientific classification
- Kingdom: Animalia
- Phylum: Arthropoda
- Class: Insecta
- Order: Coleoptera
- Suborder: Polyphaga
- Infraorder: Cucujiformia
- Family: Chrysomelidae
- Genus: Macroplea
- Species: M. appendiculata

Binomial name
- Macroplea appendiculata Panzer, 1794

= Macroplea appendiculata =

Species of beetle

Macroplea appendiculata is a species of leaf beetle of the subfamily Donaciinae which can be found in Northern and Central Europe.

== Description ==
Beetle length is 5.5–8.5 millimetres (0.22–0.33 in), and is orange. The first segment of hind tarsi much shorter than the second. Notum almost square. Thorn on top of elytron is long and thin. The head and shield with a red-yellow hairs, prothorax and elytra have a yellow color, the points in the grooves between rows, and often prominent on elytra back.

== Ecology ==
Beetles are found near rivers and lakes, they feed on generally pondweed (Potamogeton) and Myriophyllum plants.
