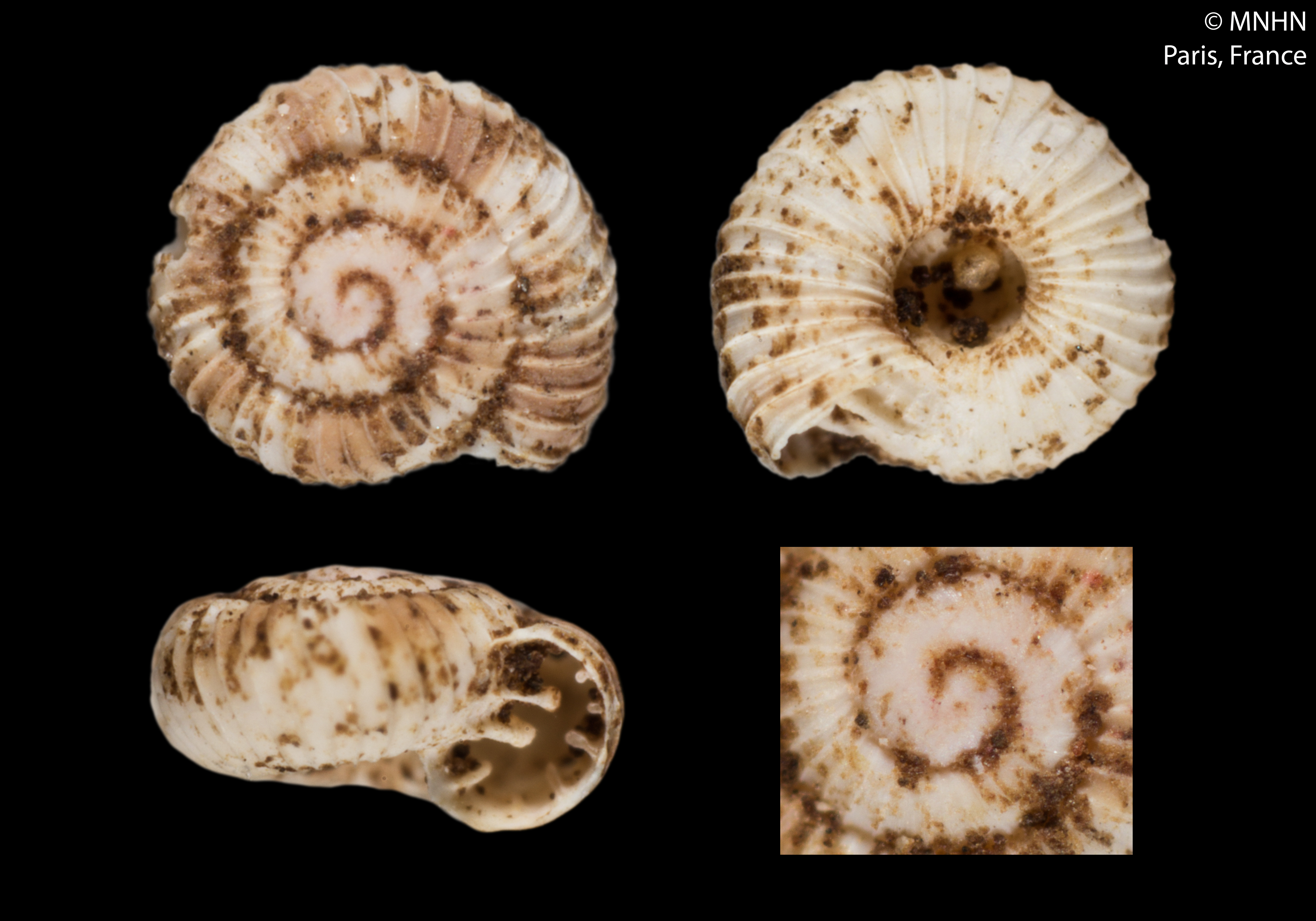
- Shell of Cookeconcha henshawi (syntype at MNHN, Paris)

Scientific classification
- Kingdom: Animalia
- Phylum: Mollusca
- Class: Gastropoda
- Order: Stylommatophora
- Family: Endodontidae
- Genus: Cookeconcha; Solem, 1976

= Cookeconcha =

Genus of gastropods

Cookeconcha is a genus of small air-breathing land snails, terrestrial pulmonate gastropod mollusks in the family Endodontidae.

== Species ==
Species within the genus Cookeconcha include:

- † Cookeconcha antiquus Solem, 1977
- Cookeconcha contorta Solem, 1976
- Cookeconcha contortus (Férussac, 1824)
- Cookeconcha cookei (Cockerell, 1933)
- Cookeconcha decussatulus (Pease, 1866)
- Cookeconcha elisae (Ancey, 1889)
- Cookeconcha henshawi (Ancey, 1904)
- Cookeconcha hystricella (L. Pfeiffer, 1859)
- Cookeconcha hystrix (L. Pfeiffer, 1846)
- Cookeconcha jugosus (Mighels, 1845)
- Cookeconcha lanaiensis (Sykes, 1896)
- Cookeconcha luctiferus (Pilsbry & Vanatta, 1905)
- Cookeconcha nudus (Ancey, 1899)
- Cookeconcha paucicostata (Pease, 1871)
- Cookeconcha paucilamellatus (Ancey, 1904)
- Cookeconcha ringens (Sykes, 1896)
- Cookeconcha stellulus (Gould, 1844)
- † Cookeconcha subpacificus (Ladd, 1958)
- Cookeconcha thaanumi (Pilsbry & Vanatta, 1905)
- Cookeconcha thwingi (Ancey, 1904)
