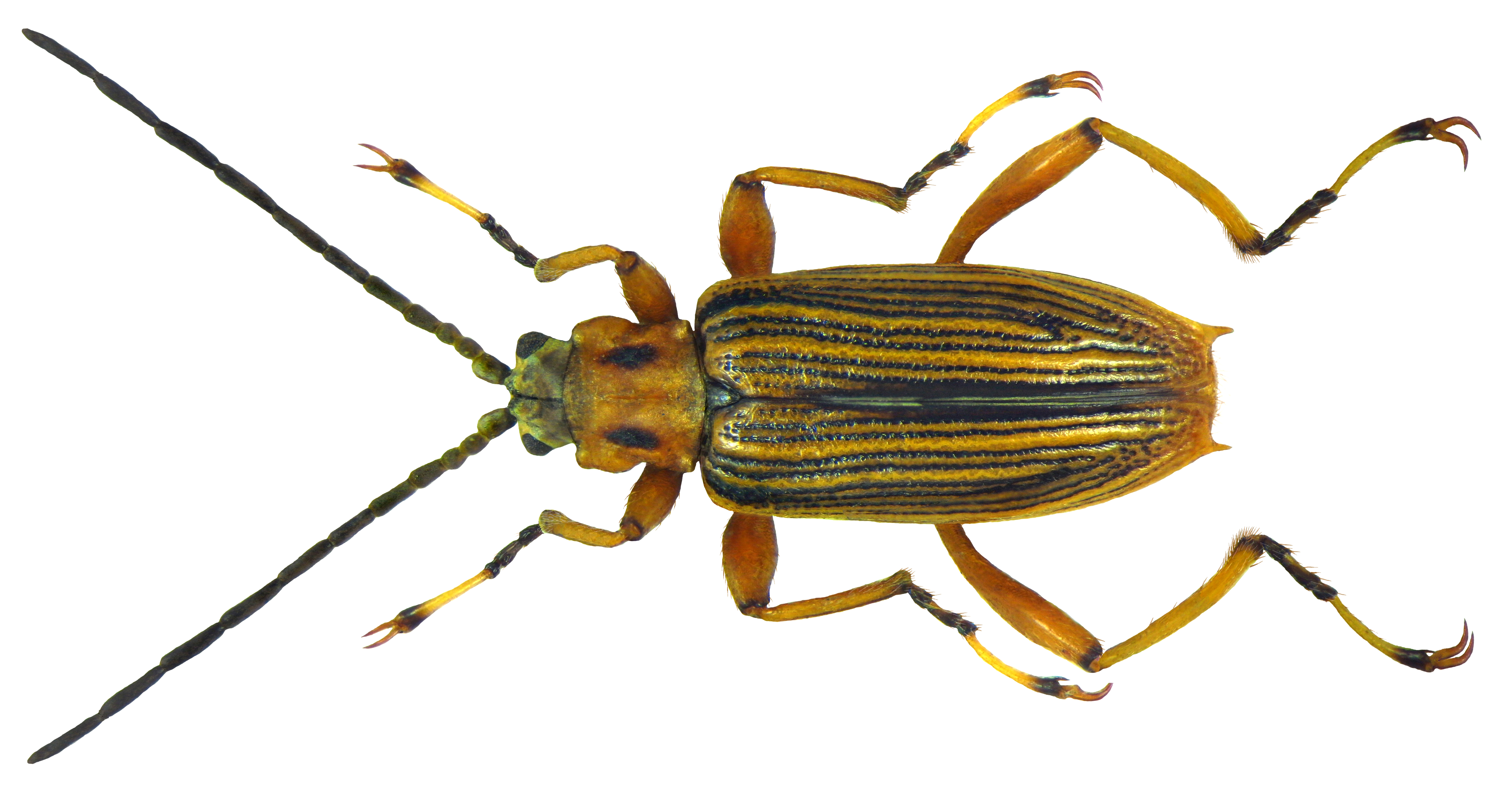
- Macroplea appendiculata

Scientific classification
- Kingdom: Animalia
- Phylum: Arthropoda
- Class: Insecta
- Order: Coleoptera
- Suborder: Polyphaga
- Infraorder: Cucujiformia
- Family: Chrysomelidae
- Subfamily: Donaciinae
- Tribe: Haemoniini
- Genus: Macroplea; Samouelle, 1819

= Macroplea =

Genus of beetles

Macroplea is a genus of beetle of the subfamily Donaciinae in the family of leaf beetles.

== Description ==
The body color is not metallic. Their paws are longer than their crus, claw segment very long, one and a half to two times higher than the rest of the body. Outer apical angle of elytron extended into a spike.

== Selected species ==
- Macroplea appendiculata (Panzer, 1794)
- Macroplea huaxiensis Lou & Liang, 2011
- Macroplea japana (Jacoby, 1885)
- Macroplea mutica (Fabricius, 1792)
- Macroplea pubipennis (Reuter, 1875)
- Macroplea ranina Lou & Yu, 2011
- Macroplea skomorokhovi Medvedev, 2006
