= Thaumatodon =

Scientific classification
- Domain: Eukaryota
- Kingdom: Animalia
- Phylum: Mollusca
- Class: Gastropoda
- Order: Stylommatophora
- Family: Endodontidae
- Genus: Thaumatodon; Pilsbry, 1893

Genus of gastropods

Thaumatodon is a genus of minute air-breathing land snails, terrestrial pulmonate gastropod mollusks in the family Endodontidae.

== Species ==
Species in the genus Thaumatodon include:

- Thaumatodon decemplicata
- Thaumatodon hystricelloides
- Thaumatodon multilamellata
