= Orangia =

Scientific classification
- Kingdom: Animalia
- Phylum: Mollusca
- Class: Gastropoda
- Order: Stylommatophora
- Family: Endodontidae
- Genus: Orangia; Solem, 1976

Genus of gastropods

Orangia is a genus of small air-breathing land snails, terrestrial pulmonate gastropod mollusks in the family Charopidae or in Endodontidae.

== Species ==
Species within the genus Orangia include:

- Orangia cookei
- Orangia maituatensis
- Orangia sporadica
