= Ruatara koarana =

Conservation status
- Critically Endangered (IUCN 2.3)

Scientific classification
- Kingdom: Animalia
- Phylum: Mollusca
- Class: Gastropoda
- Order: Stylommatophora
- Family: Charopidae
- Genus: Ruatara
- Species: R. koarana

Binomial name
- Ruatara koarana Solem, 1976

Species of gastropod

Ruatara koarana is a species of small air-breathing land snail, a terrestrial pulmonate gastropod mollusk in the family Charopidae. This species is endemic to French Polynesia.
