= Macroplea huaxiensis =

Scientific classification
- Kingdom: Animalia
- Phylum: Arthropoda
- Clade: Pancrustacea
- Class: Insecta
- Order: Coleoptera
- Suborder: Polyphaga
- Infraorder: Cucujiformia
- Family: Chrysomelidae
- Subfamily: Donaciinae
- Tribe: Haemoniini
- Genus: Macroplea
- Species: M. huaxiensis

Binomial name
- Macroplea huaxiensis Lou & Liang, 2011
- Type locality: Huaxi District, Guizhou Province, at 1100 m:'"`UNIQ--ref-00000002-QINU`"'

Species of water beetle

Macroplea huaxiensis is a species of water beetle in the subfamily Donaciinae of the Chrysomelidae family, and was first described in 2011 by three Chinese entomologists, Qiaozhe Lou, Yu Peiyu and Hongbin Liang. The species epithet, huaxiensis, describes the species as coming from the Huaxi District (on the Huaxi River), in China.

Larval host species are Vallisneria natans and Ottelia acuminata.

This species of beetle is found in China, in Guizhou Province.
