= Ishikawatrechus =

Scientific classification
- Kingdom: Animalia
- Phylum: Arthropoda
- Class: Insecta
- Order: Coleoptera
- Suborder: Adephaga
- Family: Carabidae
- Subfamily: Trechinae
- Tribe: Trechini
- Subtribe: Trechina
- Genus: Ishikawatrechus; Habu, 1950

Genus of beetles

Ishikawatrechus is a genus in the beetle family Carabidae. There are more than 30 described species in Ishikawatrechus, found in Japan.

== Species ==
These 32 species belong to the genus Ishikawatrechus:

- Ishikawatrechus annulus Sugaya & Hara, 2020
- Ishikawatrechus aquilonius Ueno, 2008
- Ishikawatrechus bidilatatus Sugaya & Yamasako, 2014
- Ishikawatrechus caurus Ueno, 2008
- Ishikawatrechus cerberus Ueno, 1957
- Ishikawatrechus doiensis Ueno & Naito, 2008
- Ishikawatrechus hayashii Ueno, 1999
- Ishikawatrechus humeralis Ueno, 1957
- Ishikawatrechus intermedius Ueno, 1957 (extinct?)
- Ishikawatrechus ishiharai Ueno, 1994
- Ishikawatrechus ishikawai (Ueno, 1951)
- Ishikawatrechus kusamai Ueno, 1999
- Ishikawatrechus longipes Ueno, 1992
- Ishikawatrechus masazii Ueno, 2002
- Ishikawatrechus murakamii Ueno, 1997
- Ishikawatrechus nipponicus Habu, 1950
- Ishikawatrechus obliquatus Ueno, 1997
- Ishikawatrechus ochii Ueno, 1996
- Ishikawatrechus orientalis Ueno, 2008
- Ishikawatrechus professoris Ueno, 1999
- Ishikawatrechus pubithoracis Ueno, 2002
- Ishikawatrechus riozoi Ueno, 1999
- Ishikawatrechus robustior Ueno, 1997
- Ishikawatrechus satoi Ueno, 2003
- Ishikawatrechus saxatilis Ueno, 2003
- Ishikawatrechus septemtrionalis Ueno, 2008
- Ishikawatrechus squamosus Ueno, 1997
- Ishikawatrechus subtilis Ueno, 1957
- Ishikawatrechus taichii Ueno, 2008
- Ishikawatrechus tuberculatus Ueno, 2008
- Ishikawatrechus uozumii (Ueno, 1951)
- Ishikawatrechus yosiianus Ueno, 1999
