= Kondoconcha =

Scientific classification
- Kingdom: Animalia
- Phylum: Mollusca
- Class: Gastropoda
- Order: Stylommatophora
- Family: Charopidae
- Genus: Kondoconcha; Solem, 1976

Genus of gastropods

Kondoconcha is a genus of small air-breathing land snails, terrestrial pulmonate gastropod mollusks in the family Charopidae.

== Species ==
Species within the genus Kondoconcha include:

- Kondoconcha othnius
