= Rakantrechus =

Scientific classification
- Domain: Eukaryota
- Kingdom: Animalia
- Phylum: Arthropoda
- Class: Insecta
- Order: Coleoptera
- Suborder: Adephaga
- Family: Carabidae
- Subfamily: Trechinae
- Tribe: Trechini
- Subtribe: Trechina
- Genus: Rakantrechus; Ueno, 1951

Subgenera
- Izushites Ueno, 1982; Paratrechiama Ueno, 1959; Pilosotrechiama Ueno, 1958; Rakantrechus Ueno, 1951; Uozumitrechus Ueno, 1958

Genus of beetles

Rakantrechus is a genus in the beetle family Carabidae. There are more than 20 described species in Rakantrechus, found in Japan.

== Species ==
These 27 species belong to the genus Rakantrechus:

- Rakantrechus andoi Ueno, 1959
- Rakantrechus asonis Ueno, 1974
- Rakantrechus asthenes Ueno, 1987
- Rakantrechus constrictus Ueno, 1959
- Rakantrechus elegans Ueno, 1960
- Rakantrechus etoi Ueno, 1958
- Rakantrechus fretensis Ueno, 2008
- Rakantrechus gracillimus Ueno, 1959
- Rakantrechus kawasawai Ueno, 1951
- Rakantrechus kikuyai Ueno, 1987
- Rakantrechus kurosai Ueno, 1959
- Rakantrechus lallum Ueno, 1970
- Rakantrechus macer Ueno, 1987
- Rakantrechus masumotoi Ueno & Naito, 2011
- Rakantrechus mirabilis Ueno, 1958
- Rakantrechus mukaibarai Ueno, 1958
- Rakantrechus nomurai Ueno, 1960
- Rakantrechus notsui Ueno, 2010
- Rakantrechus obscurus Ueno & Naito, 2008
- Rakantrechus pallescens Ueno, 1960
- Rakantrechus peninsularis Ueno & Naito, 2008
- Rakantrechus subglaber Ueno, 1982
- Rakantrechus taio Ueno & Sone, 2000
- Rakantrechus tenuis Ueno, 2008
- Rakantrechus tofaceus Ueno, 1970
- Rakantrechus truncaticollis Ueno, 1970
- Rakantrechus yoshikoae Ueno, 1970
