= Nesophila (gastropod) =

Scientific classification
- Kingdom: Animalia
- Phylum: Mollusca
- Class: Gastropoda
- Order: Stylommatophora
- Infraorder: incertae sedis
- Superfamily: Punctoidea
- Family: Endodontidae
- Genus: Nesophila; Pilsbry, 1893

Type species
- Helix tiara Mighels, 1845

Synonyms
- Endodonta (Nesophila) Pilsbry, 1893

Genus of molluscs

Nesophila is a genus of gastropods belonging to the family Endodontidae.

The species of this genus are found in Pacific Ocean.

Species:

- Nesophila baldwini (Ancey, 1889)
- Nesophila capillata (Pease, 1866)
- Nesophila distans (Pease, 1866)
- Nesophila misoolensis (Adam & van Benthem Jutting, 1939)
- Nesophila tiara (Mighels, 1845)

Species brought into synonymy

- Nesophila demani (Tapparone Canefri, 1883): synonym of Lagivala demani (Tapparone-Canefri, 1883) (superseded combination)
