= Ogasawarana habei =

Conservation status
- Critically Endangered (IUCN 2.3)

Scientific classification
- Kingdom: Animalia
- Phylum: Mollusca
- Class: Gastropoda
- Order: Cycloneritida
- Family: Helicinidae
- Genus: Ogasawarana
- Species: O. habei

Binomial name
- Ogasawarana habei Minato, 1980

Species of gastropod

Ogasawarana habei is a species of land snail with an operculum, a terrestrial gastropod mollusk in the family Helicinidae, the helicinids.

== Distribution ==
This species is endemic to Japan.
