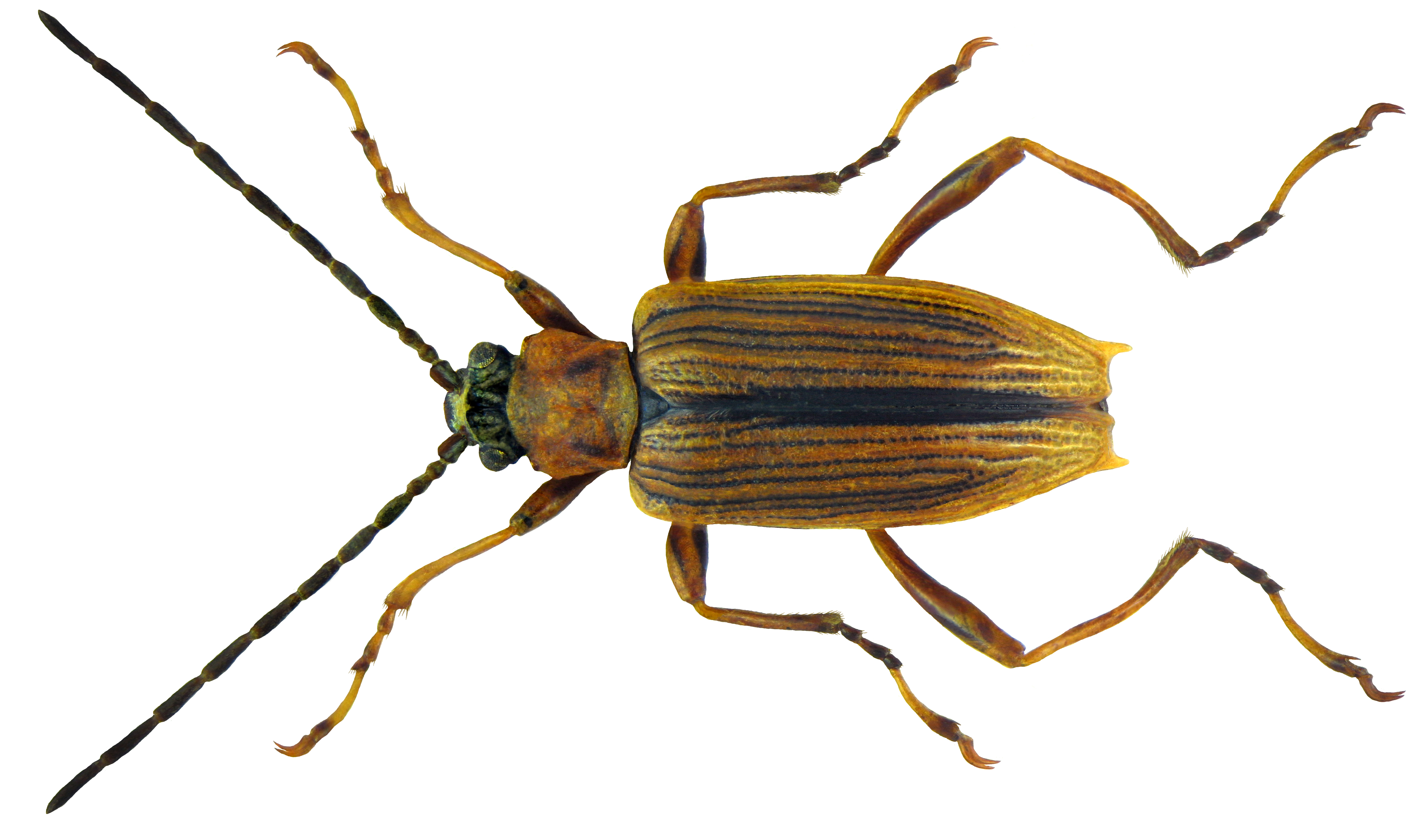

Scientific classification
- Kingdom: Animalia
- Phylum: Arthropoda
- Clade: Pancrustacea
- Class: Insecta
- Order: Coleoptera
- Suborder: Polyphaga
- Infraorder: Cucujiformia
- Family: Chrysomelidae
- Genus: Macroplea
- Species: M. mutica

Binomial name
- Macroplea mutica Fabricius, 1792

= Macroplea mutica =

Species of beetle

Macroplea mutica is a species of leaf beetles of the subfamily Donaciinae. It considered to be a Palearctic species, but can be found in Central Europe and Turkey.

== Discovery ==
The species were first discovered by Johan Christian Fabricius in 1792, in Eastern Anatolia. Throughout time, the species have been discovered in South England and Ireland, and also, in countries of Central Europe, such as: North Germany, and Hungary. The species were also found in Scandinavia, especially in countries like Sweden, and Finland.

== Description ==
Adults size is 4.5–6 mm, but could extend up to 7 mm. Prothorax much narrowed to the base, mostly with two or three longitudinal black spots. The vertex angle of elytron is extended in a triangular spine.

== Distribution ==
The beetle lives in Baltic, Mediterranean, and Caspian Seas. Some of the species were discovered on Lake Balaton, in Hungary, which were apparently relatives of the Baltic Sea species.

== Threat level ==
The species is on mixed level of danger. In Poland it considered to be critically endangered, while at the same time, in Germany, is considered to be on an Endangered species list. In Sweden and Finland, though, no decline have been recorded, so the species are not in any danger there at all.

== Ecology ==
Adult beetles are grazing on the leaves of pondweed (Potamogeton) and Ruppia (Ruppiaceae).
