= Antoni Józef Wagner =

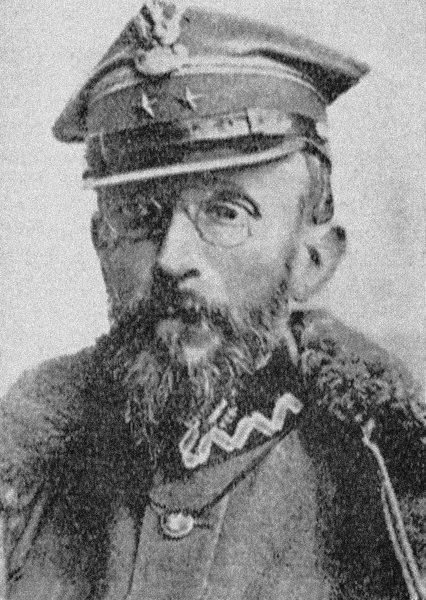
- Born: 1 February 1860; Ustroń, Silesia
- Died: 12 June 1928 (aged 68); Styria
- Education: University of Vienna
- Known for: Research on molluscs and the malacofauna of the Balkans
- Scientific career
- Fields: Zoology, malacology
- Workplaces: Museum and Institute of Zoology of the Polish Academy of Sciences

Antoni Józef Wagner (1 February 1860 – 12 June 1928) was a Polish zoologist and malacologist. He was the first director of the Museum and Institute of Zoology of the Polish Academy of Sciences.

== Biography ==
Wagner studied natural sciences and medicine at the University of Vienna. He subsequently joined the Austro-Hungarian Army, where he obtained the rank of medical lieutenant in 1886. He later served as a professor at the military academy in Wiener Neustadt.

During the First World War, Wagner served as commander of military hospitals. In 1920, after joining the Polish Army, he was promoted to the rank of lieutenant colonel of the medical corps. From 1921 he served as director of the Polish State Museum of Natural History in Warsaw, now associated with the Museum and Institute of Zoology of the Polish Academy of Sciences.

In 1926, Wagner participated in the International Congress of the European bison Protection League in Vienna. He was the author of 28 scientific publications and was regarded as one of the leading taxonomists of molluscs and specialists on the malacofauna of the Balkan Peninsula and neighbouring countries. He also participated in efforts to protect populations of the European bison.

== Selected publications ==
Wagner was the author of 28 scientific papers, primarily concerning the taxonomy and distribution of molluscs.
