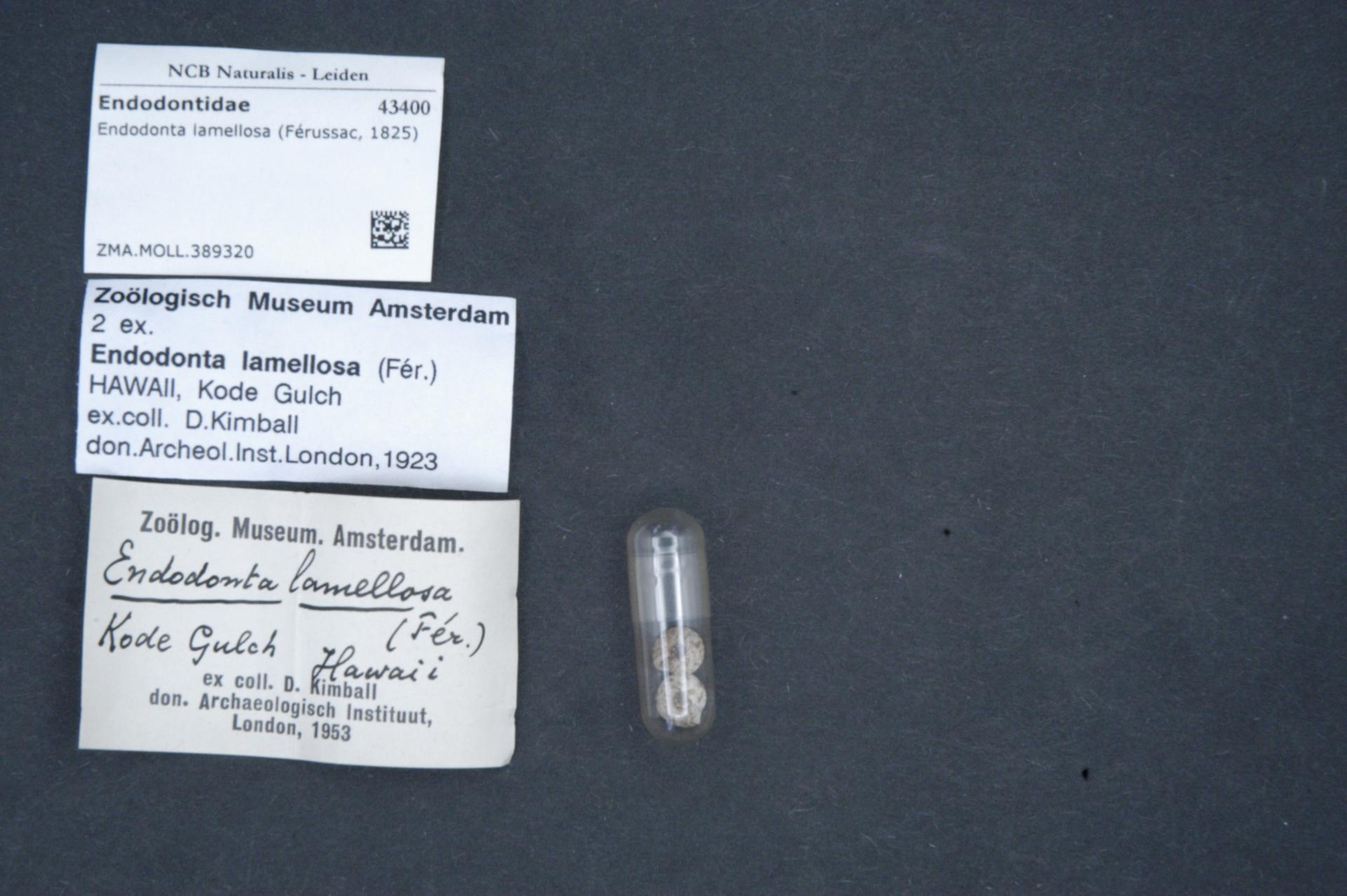
- Endodonta lamellosa shells

Scientific classification
- Kingdom: Animalia
- Phylum: Mollusca
- Class: Gastropoda
- Order: Stylommatophora
- Superfamily: Punctoidea
- Family: Endodontidae; Pilsbry, 1895

= Endodontidae =

Family of gastropods

Endodontidae is a taxonomic family of very small air-breathing land snails and slugs, terrestrial pulmonate gastropod molluscs in the superfamily Punctoidea.

This family, which includes both snails and slugs, appears to have once been much more diverse, but has declined, and is now endangered due to human activity.

== Anatomy ==
In this family, the number of haploid chromosomes lies between 26 and 35 (according to the values in this table).

== Distribution and conservation status ==
This family is found only in the Pacific islands. The family is critically endangered and on the verge of extinction, mainly because of habitat loss due to human development. On American Samoa, some species are in decline due to predation by introduced fire ants. On Rurutu in French Polynesia the family is only known by subfossil shells. At least 18 endemic species are known of which four were described in 2009 and eight were described as new to science in 2013. Only one of them survived into the first half of the 20th century. Most of them became extinct due to the degradation of their habitats.

== Genera ==
The family Endodontidae has no subfamilies.

The following genera are recognised in the family Endodontidae:

- Aaadonta
- Anceyodonta
- Australdonta
- Beilania
- Cookeconcha
- Endodonta Albers, 1850 - type genus of the family Endodontidae
- Gambiodonta
- †Hebeispira
- Kleokyphus
- Kondoconcha
- Libera
- Mautodontha
- Minidonta
- Nesodiscus
- Nesophila
- Opanara
- Orangia
- Planudonta
- Priceconcha
- †Protoendodonta
- Pseudolibera
- Rhysoconcha
- Rikitea
- Ruatara
- Taipidon
- Thaumatodon
- Zyzzyxdonta
