= Amphidromus richardi =

Scientific classification
- Kingdom: Animalia
- Phylum: Mollusca
- Class: Gastropoda
- Order: Stylommatophora
- Family: Camaenidae
- Genus: Amphidromus
- Species: A. richardi

Binomial name
- Amphidromus richardi Severns, 2006

Species of tree snail

Amphidromus richardi is a species of air-breathing snail, an arboreal gastropod mollusk in the family Camaenidae. It is endemic to Timor-Leste.

== Taxonomy ==
Amphidromus richardi was first formally described in 2006 by the American malacologist Mike Severns with its type locality given as Atauro, East Timor, Nusa Tenggara on the northwestern coast at an elevation of 100 m (330 ft). In the same paper Severns described two subspecies, the second subspecies A. r. manacocoensis was given the type locality of the summit of Mt. Mana Coco at an elevation of 1,000 m (3,300 ft). The two subspecies are isolated from one another by an elevation of 1,000 m (3,300 ft) and a distance of several kilometers, where there is no suitable habitat. This species is classified in the Indo-Pacific genus Amphidromus which has a wide dsitribution from India to northern Australia. This genus belongs to the subfamily Camaeninae in the family Camaenidae which is part of the suborder Helicina in the order Stylommatophora in the class Gastropoda. A. richardi belongs to the Amphidromus inconstans species complex within the subgenus Syndromus.

=== Subspecies ===
Amphidromus richardi is divided into the following subspecies:

- Amphidromus richardi manacocoensis Severns, 2006 -limestone plateau in the lowland costal hills of northern and western Atauro
- Amphidromus richardi richardi Severns, 2006 - summit of Manucoco

== Etymology ==
Amphidromus richardi has a specific name which honors the American malacologist and shell collector Richard L. Goldberg who supported Severns' trips to the Lesser Sundas, where he disvoevered several new species of Amphidromus and who gave te author invaluable information from his own book collection.

== Description ==
Amphidromus richardi has a sinistral shell with reaches a length of 36.78 mm (1.448 in) and a diameter of 18.04 mm (0.710 in) The nominate subspecies has amny dark bands and yellow blotches over a thick white shell while A. r. manacocoensis has a much thinner, glossier shell with more expanded whorls. Typically A. r. manacocoensis is less patterned and the shell is smooth without ridges, the nominate subspecies usually has one or two ridges. The nominate subspecies is the slightly larger of the two.

== Distribution and habitat ==
Amphidromus richardi is endemic to Atauro, an island off the northeast coast of Timor Leste. The nominate subspecies is found in small trees and a limestone plateau in the coastal hills on the north and west of the island while A. r. manacocoensis is found only inevergreen forest on thesummit of Mount Manucoco.
