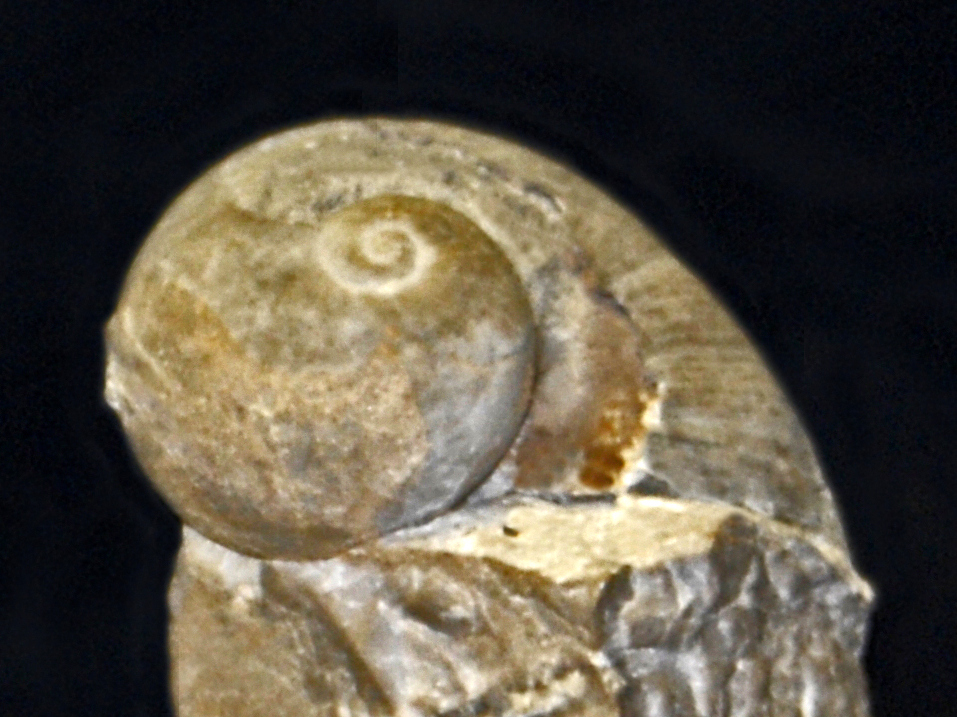
- Fossil shells of Fedaiella species from Scalvino (Italy) - Triassic

Scientific classification
- Kingdom: Animalia
- Phylum: Mollusca
- Class: Gastropoda
- Order: Cycloneritida
- Family: †Fedaiellidae
- Genus: †Fedaiella; Kittl 1894

Synonyms
- Naticopsis

= Fedaiella =

Fedaiella Temporal range: 242.0–0.012 Ma

Extinct genus of gastropods

Fedaiella is an extinct genus of sea snail, a marine gastropod mollusc in the family Fedaiellidae, within the clade Neritimorpha.

== Species ==
- Fedaiella beneckei † Böhm 1895
- Fedaiella cuccensis † Kittl 1894
- Fedaiella elongata † Münster 1841
- Fedaiella fastosa † Stoppani 1857
- Fedaiella ingens † Kittl 1894
- Fedaiella lemniscata † Hoernes 1856
- Fedaiella meriani † Hoernes 1856
- Fedaiella monstrum † Stoppani 1857
- Fedaiella neritacea † Münster 1841
- Fedaiella prolixa † Stoppani 1857
- Fedaiella retropunctata † Stoppani 1857
- Fedaiella stoppanii † Marini 1896

== Distribution ==
Fossils of Fedaiella are found in the marine strata of the Quaternary of Japan, Paleocene of Poland and Triassic of Italy.
