= Neritoida =

Order of gastropods

Neritoida was a taxonomic order of sea snails, freshwater snails and land snails, gastropod molluscs. This order was placed within the superorder Neritopsina within the order Orthogastropoda. Now see Neritoidea.

== Superfamilies ==
Superfamilies within the order Neritoida were:

- Helicinoidea
- Hydrocenoidea
- Neritoidea
- Neritopsoidea
- Symmetrocapuloidea
