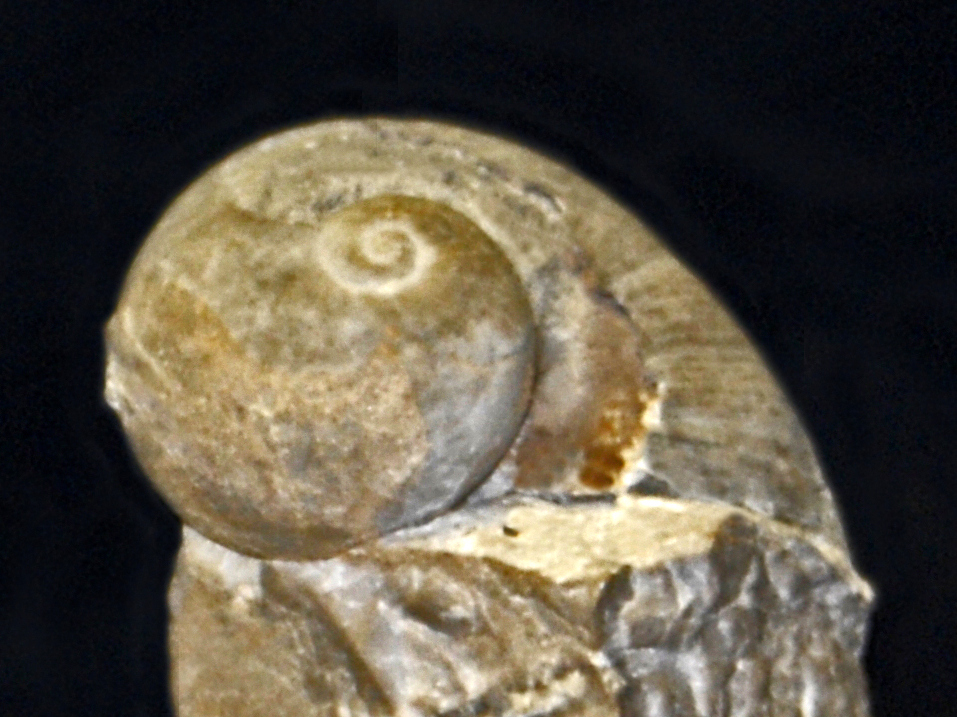
- Fossil shells of Fedaiella species from Scalvino (Italy) - Triassic

Scientific classification
- Kingdom: Animalia
- Phylum: Mollusca
- Class: Gastropoda
- Order: Cycloneritida
- Superfamily: Neritopsoidea
- Family: †Fedaiellidae; Bandel, 2007

= Fedaiellidae =

Fedaiellidae Temporal range: 242.0–0.012 Ma

Extinct family of gastropods

Fedaiellidae is an extinct family of fossil sea snails, marine gastropod mollusks in the clade Neritimorpha.

== Distribution ==
Fossils of the genus Fedaiella are found in the marine strata of the Quaternary of Japan, the Paleocene of Poland and the Triassic of Italy.
