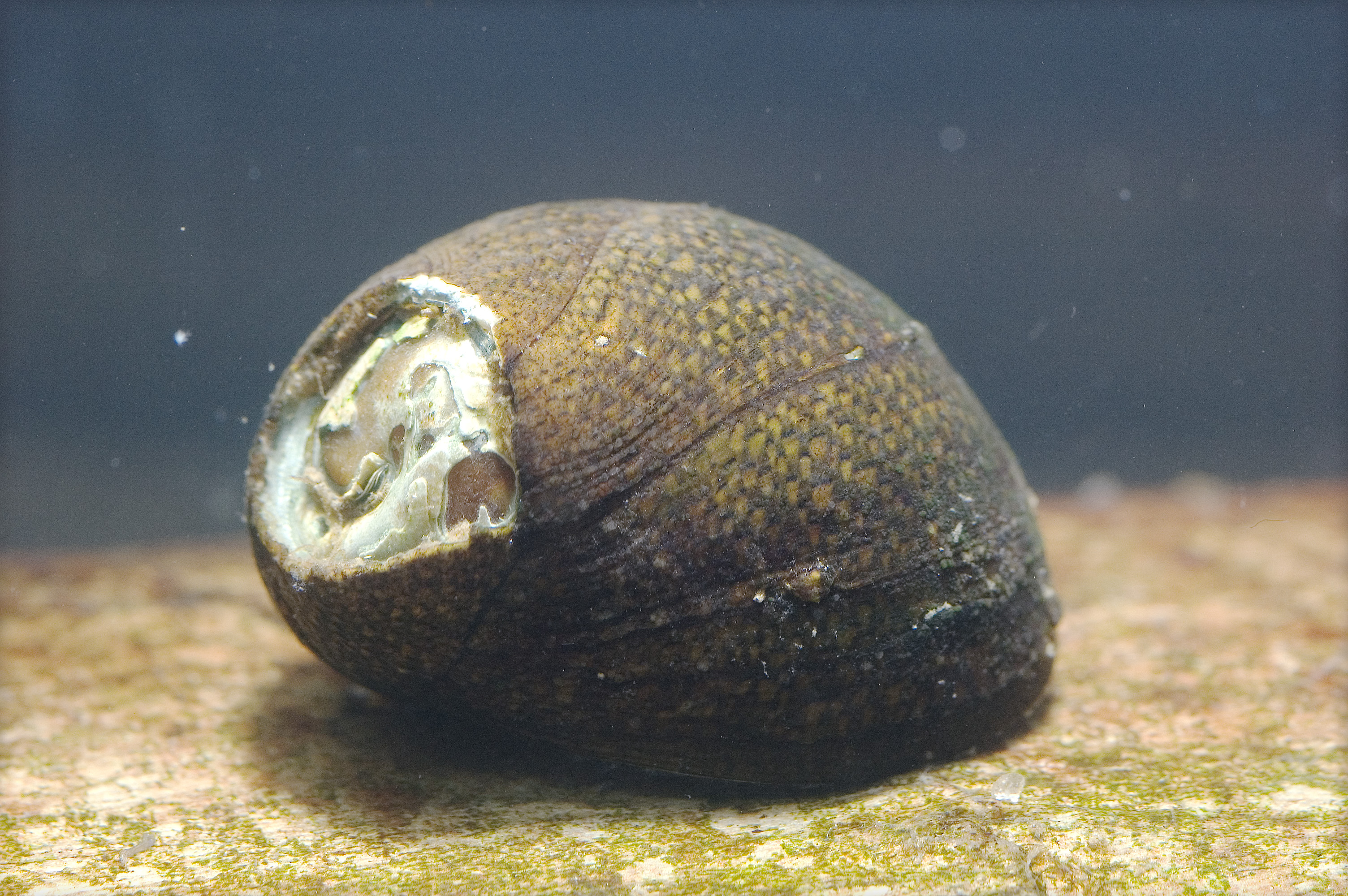
- Clithon retropictum

Scientific classification
- Kingdom: Animalia
- Phylum: Mollusca
- Class: Gastropoda
- Order: Cycloneritida
- Superfamily: Neritoidea
- Family: Neritidae
- Genus: Clithon; Montfort, 1810

Type species
- Nerita corona Linnaeus, 1758

Synonyms
- Clithon (Clithon) Montfort, 1810; Clithon (Pictoneritina) Iredale, 1936; Corona Récluz, 1850 (objective synonym); Nerita (Clithon) Montfort, 1810; Neritina (Clithon) Montfort, 1810; Pictoneritina Iredale, 1936*; Theodoxus (Pictoneritina) Iredale, 1936 (new combination)

= Clithon =

Genus of gastropods

Clithon is a genus of freshwater snails or brackish snails that have an operculum, aquatic gastropod molluscs in the family Neritidae, the nerites.

== Distribution ==
Distribution of the genus Clithon includes the Comoro Islands (3 species), Madagascar (3 or more species) and the Mascarene Islands.

== Description ==
Some species, such as Clithon coronatum have spines on its shell.

== Species ==
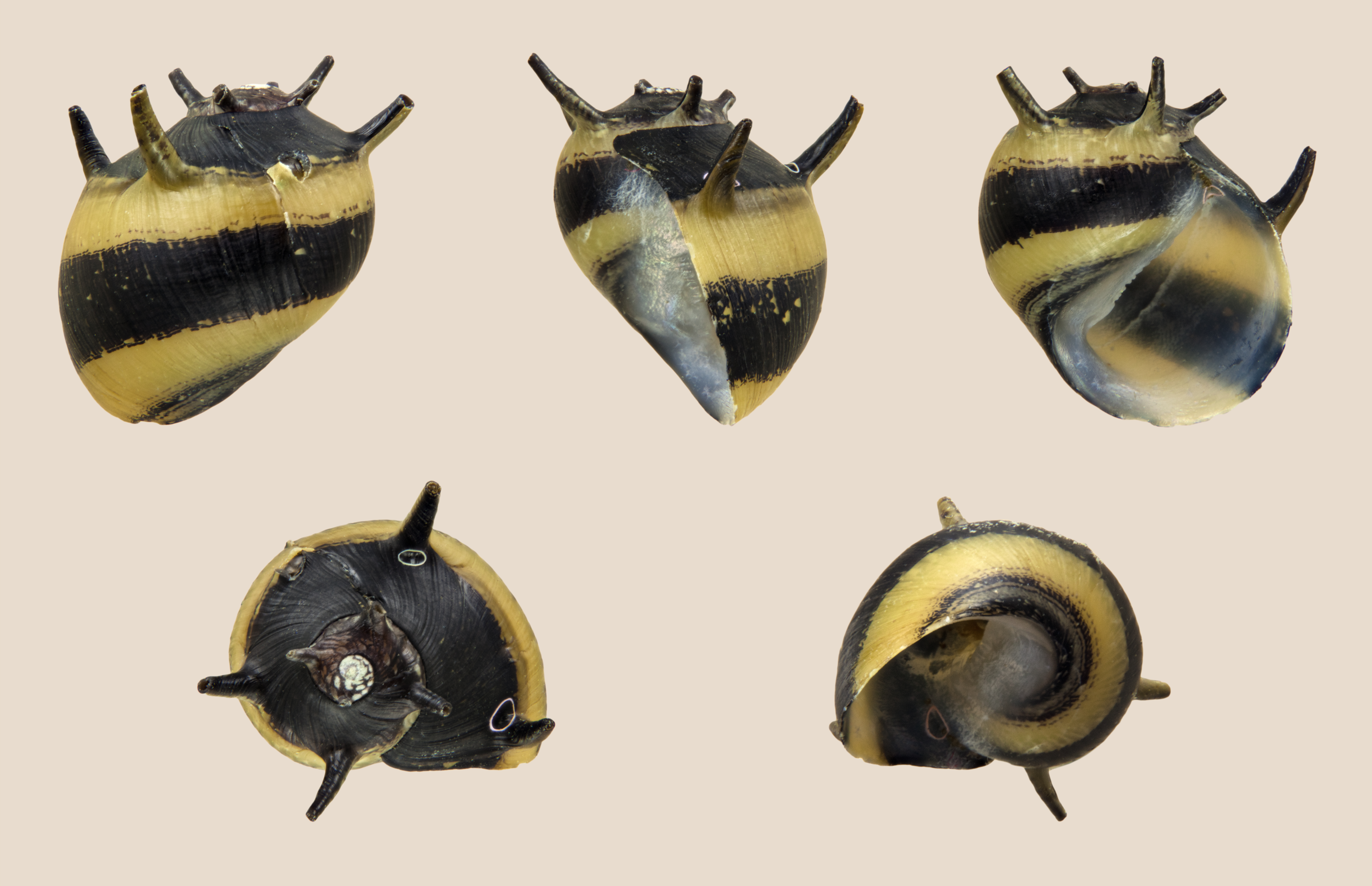
Clithon diadema shell

Species in the genus Clithon include:

- Clithon angulosum (Récluz, 1843)
- Clithon aspersum (G. B. Sowerby II, 1849)
- † Clithon avellana (Récluz, 1842)
- Clithon barbei Symonds & Pacaud, 2010 †
- † Clithon bezieri (Dalimier, 1918)
- Clithon bicolor (Récluz, 1843)
- † Clithon bouryi (Cossmann, 1888)
- † Clithon bristowi (Wenz, 1929)
- Clithon castanea (Hombron & Jacquinot, 1848)
- Clithon celatum (Récluz, 1846)
- Clithon chlorostoma (G.B. Sowerby I, 1833)
- Clithon circumvolutum (Récluz, 1843)
- † Clithon coeuvrense Vrinat, 2019
- † Clithon concavum (J. Sowerby, 1823)
- Clithon corona (Linnaeus, 1758)
- Clithon coronatum (Leach, 1815)
- † Clithon cranmorense Symonds, 2006
- Clithon cryptum Eichhorst, 2016
- Clithon cuvieriana
- Clithon diadema (Récluz, 1841)
- Clithon dispar (Pease, 1868)
- Clithon dominguense (Lamarck, 1822)
- Clithon donovani (Récluz, 1843)
- Clithon dringii (Récluz, 1846)
- Clithon elegans (Deshayes, 1824) †
- Clithon eudeli (G. B. Sowerby III, 1917)
- Clithon faba G. B. Sowerby I, 1836
- Clithon flavovirens (von dem Busch, 1843)
- Clithon francoisi (Mabille, 1895)
- Clithon fuliginosum (von dem Busch, 1843)
- † Clithon hillae ' Symonds, 2015 †
- † Clithon inequidentatum (Récluz, 1850)
- Clithon leachii (Récluz, 1841)
- Clithon lentiginosum (Reeve, 1855)
- Clithon luctuosum (Récluz, 1841)
- Clithon madecassinum (Morelet, 1860)
- Clithon mertonianum (Récluz, 1843)
- Clithon michaudi (Récluz, 1841)
- † Clithon mortoni Symonds, 2015
- Clithon nigrispinis Lesson, 1831
- Clithon nouletianus (Gassies, 1863)
- Clithon nucleolus (Morelet, 1857)
- †Clithon nucleus (Deshayes, 1832)
- † Clithon occultatum Vrinat, 2019
- Clithon olivaceum (Récluz, 1843)
- Clithon oualaniense (Lesson, 1831)
- Clithon parvulum (Le Guillou, 1841)
- † Clithon passyanum (Deshayes, 1864)
- Clithon peguense (Blanford, 1867)
- † Clithon pisiforme (Férussac, 1823)
- † Clithon planulatum (F. E. Edwards in Lowry, 1866)
- † Clithon pococki Symonds, 2015
- Clithon pritchardi (Dohrn, 1861)
- Clithon pulchellum (Récluz, 1843)
- Clithon rarispina (Mousson, 1849)
- Clithon recluzianum (Le Guillou, 1841)
- Clithon reticulare (G. B. Sowerby I, 1836)
- Clithon retropictum (von Martens, 1879)
- Clithon rugatum (Récluz, 1842)
- Clithon ruginosum (Récluz, 1841)
- † Clithon saincenyense (Deshayes, 1864)
- † Clithon sobrinum (A. Férussac, 1823)
- Clithon souleyetanum (Récluz, 1842)
- Clithon sowerbianum (Récluz, 1843)
- Clithon spiniferum (Récluz, 1842)
- Clithon spinosum (G. B. Sowerby I, 1825) - synonyms: Clithon spinosus, Clithon spinosa
- Clithon squarrosum (Récluz, 1843)
- † Clithon stintoni Symonds, 2009
- Clithon subgranosum (G. B. Sowerby I, 1836)
- Clithon subpunctatum (Récluz, 1843)
- Clithon teres Eichhorst, 2016
- Clithon thermophilum (Martens, 1878)
- † Clithon tigrinum Vrinat, 2019 †
- † Clithon transbaicalicus Popova, 1981
- Clithon triseriale (G. B. Sowerby I, 1836) (taxon inquirendum)
- Clithon tritonense (Le Guillou, 1841) (taxon inquirendum)
- Clithon undatus Lesson, 1831
- Clithon wallacei (Dohrn, 1861)
- † Clithon waltoni (Symonds, 2002)
- † Clithon zonarium (Deshayes, 1832)

Species brought into synonymy

- Clithon exclamationis (Mabille, 1895): synonym of Clithon bicolor (Récluz, 1843)
- Clithon glabratum (G.B. Sowerby II, 1849): synonym of Vitta glabrata (G. B. Sowerby II, 1849)
- Clithon longispina (Récluz, 1841): synonym of Clithon coronatum (Leach, 1815) (junior synonym)

== Ecology ==
It lives in rapid streams.
