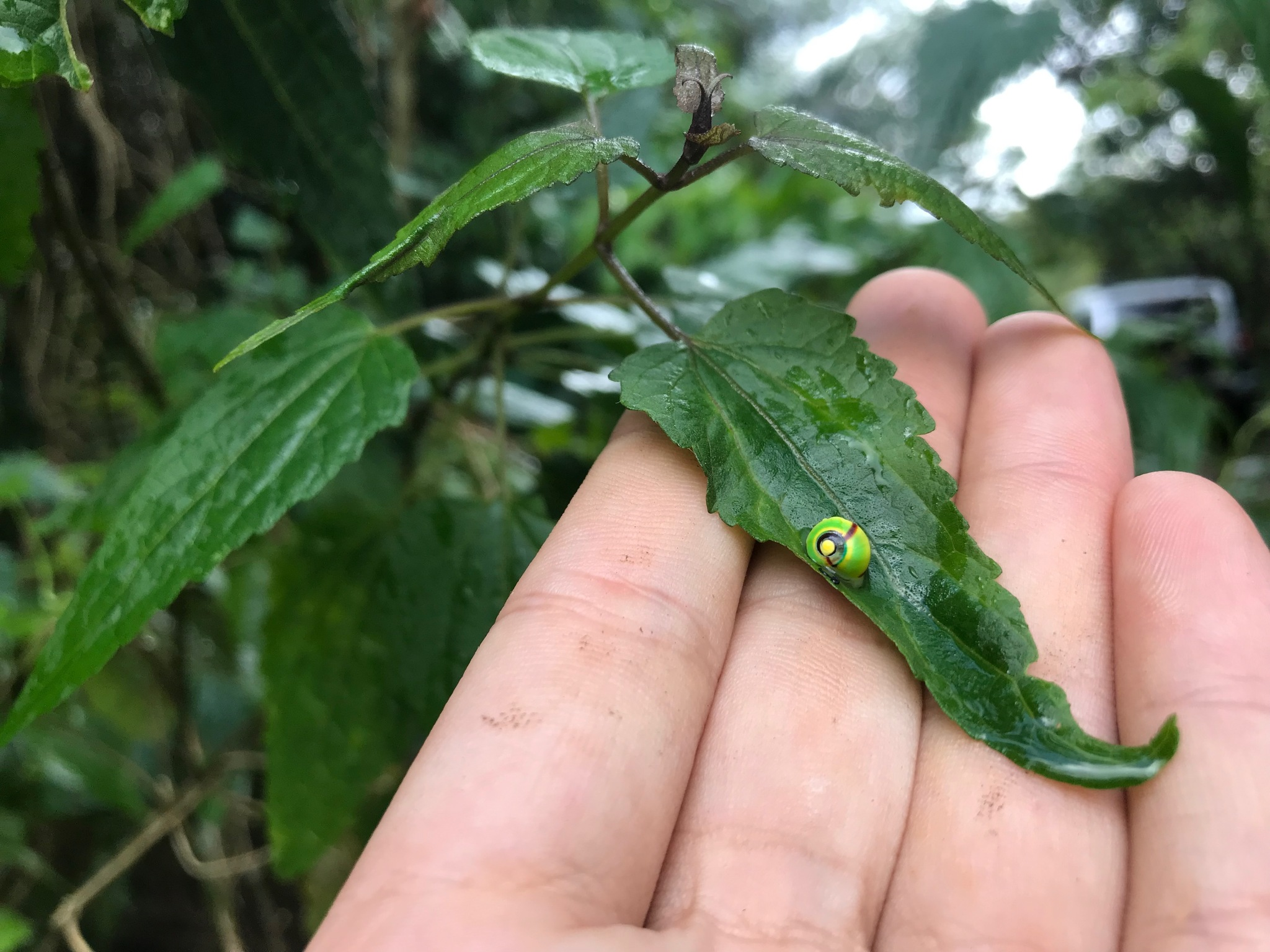

Scientific classification
- Kingdom: Animalia
- Phylum: Mollusca
- Class: Gastropoda
- Order: Cycloneritida
- Family: Helicinidae
- Genus: Helicina
- Species: H. viridis

Binomial name
- Helicina viridis Lamarck, 1822

= Helicina viridis =

Species of mollusc

Helicina viridis is a species of land snail of the genus Helicina. It is found in the Dominican Republic.

== Description ==
H. viridis is a small snail with a green shell. Its shell is ovular and slightly flattened, ornamented by brown markings, a yellow outer lip, and a white keel.
