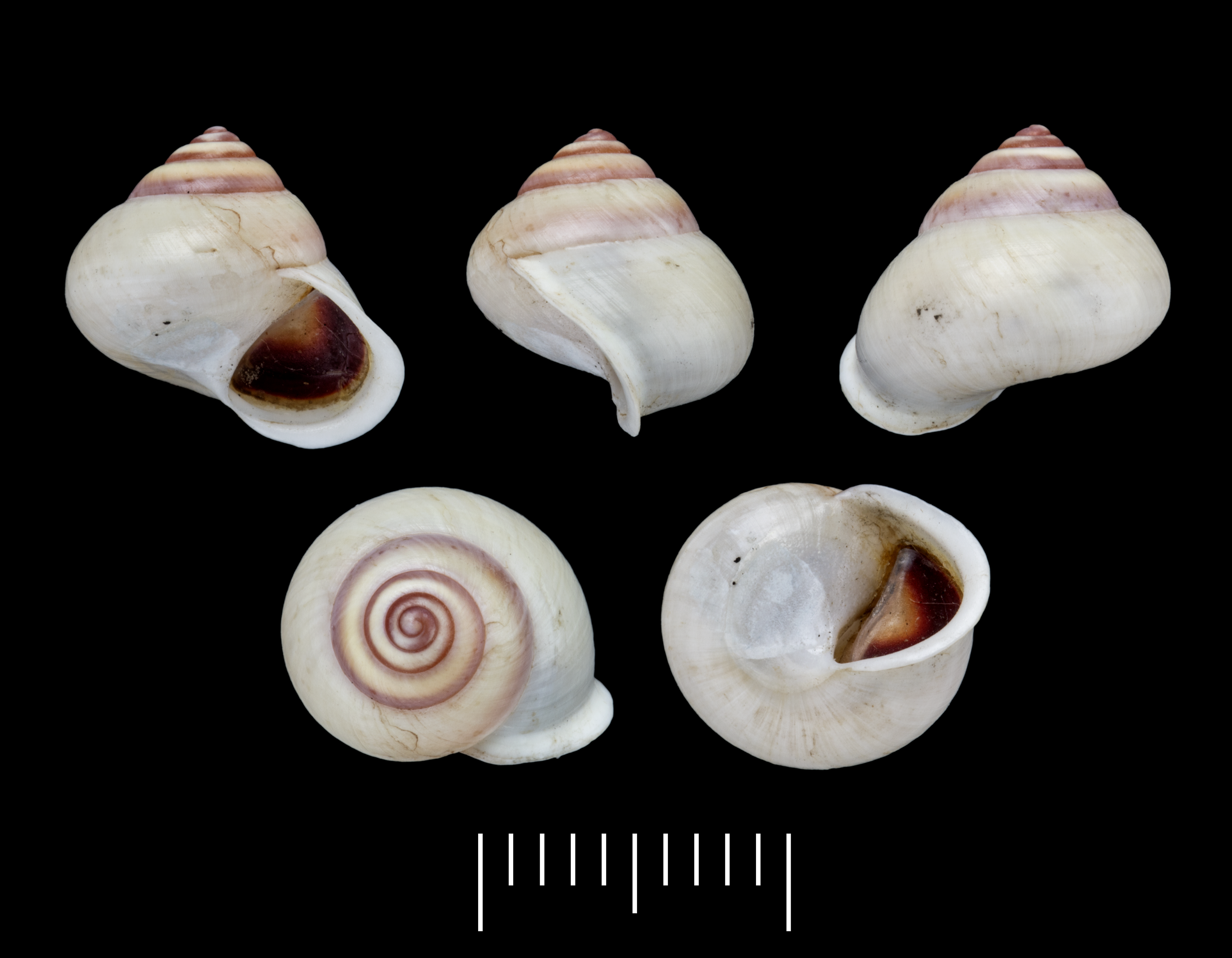
- Helicina nemoralis (Guppy, 1866)

Scientific classification
- Kingdom: Animalia
- Phylum: Mollusca
- Class: Gastropoda
- Order: Cycloneritida
- Family: Helicinidae
- Genus: Helicina
- Species: H. nemoralis

Binomial name
- Helicina nemoralis Guppy, 1866

Synonyms
- Helicina zonata Guppy, 1864

= Helicina nemoralis =

Species of land snail

Helicina nemoralis is a species of tropical land snail in the family Helicinidae.
