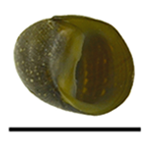
- Apertural view of Clithon lentiginosum shell. Scale bar is 10 mm.
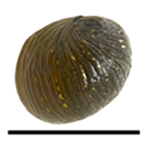
- Abapertural view of Clithon lentiginosum shell. Scale bar is 10 mm.

Scientific classification
- Kingdom: Animalia
- Phylum: Mollusca
- Class: Gastropoda
- Order: Cycloneritida
- Family: Neritidae
- Genus: Clithon
- Species: C. lentiginosum

Binomial name
- Clithon lentiginosum (Reeve, 1855)

Synonyms
- Neritina lentiginosa Reeve, 1855

= Clithon lentiginosum =

Species of gastropod

Clithon lentiginosum is a species of a freshwater snail with an operculum, a nerite. It is an aquatic gastropod mollusk in the family Neritidae, the nerites.

== Human use ==
It is a part of ornamental pet trade for freshwater aquaria.
