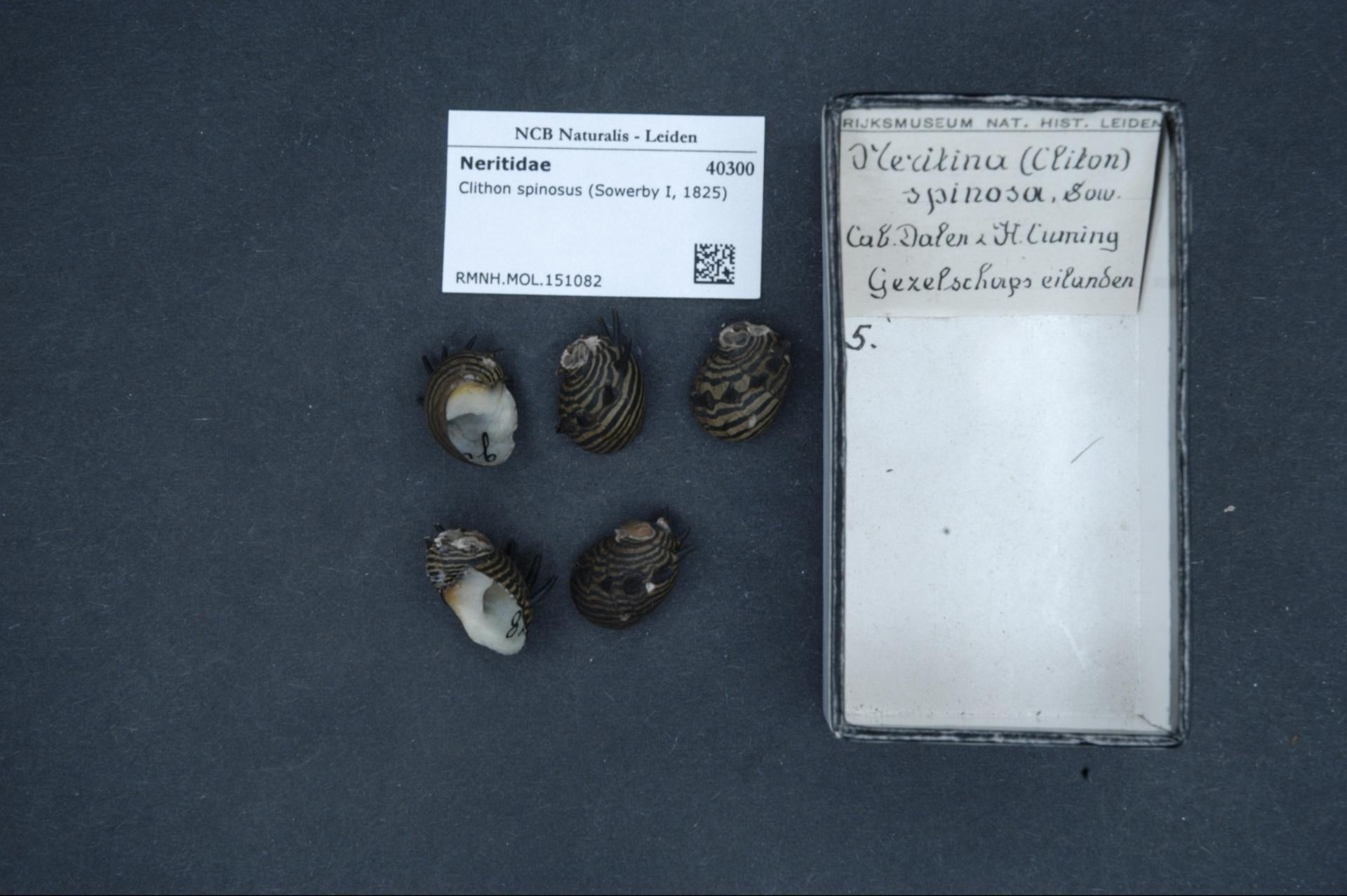
- Clithon spinosum shells

Scientific classification
- Kingdom: Animalia
- Phylum: Mollusca
- Class: Gastropoda
- Order: Cycloneritida
- Family: Neritidae
- Genus: Clithon
- Species: C. spinosum

Binomial name
- Clithon spinosum (G. B. Sowerby I, 1825)

Synonyms
- Neritina spinosa G. B. Sowerby I, 1825 (original combination); Clithon spinosus [sic] (incorrect gender ending); Neritina undata Lamarck, 1822; Neritina inermis Martens, 1878

= Clithon spinosum =

Species of gastropod

Clithon spinosum is a species of brackish water and freshwater snail with an operculum, a nerite. It is an aquatic gastropod mollusk in the family Neritidae, the nerites.

== Distribution ==
Distribution of Clithon spinosum includes the Indo-Pacific and it ranges from New Guinea and south-eastern Asia and eastern Asia to Marquesas. It also occurs in Japan, New Georgia, Fiji and Tahiti and in French Polynesia including the following Society Islands: Tahiti, Mo'orea, Raiatea, Huahine.

== Description ==
There are always spines on its shell. Spines are long and thin and they are directed rearward. The width of the shell is 15–20 mm.

== Ecology ==
Clithon spinosum is a dioecious (it has two separate sexes) and amphidromous snail. Adults live in freshwater and larvae are marine. Larvae are long-lived planktotrophs. Adults prefer boulders and cobbles over granules as a substrate. They were found mainly on bottom of rocks in aquaria and in situ. They are reported from altitude 0–10 m a.s.l. They can reach densities up to 57.0 ± 17.3 snails per square meter of a stream. Adults can survive 8 hours in seawater (longer exposure was not tested).

It is not used as food source by humans.
