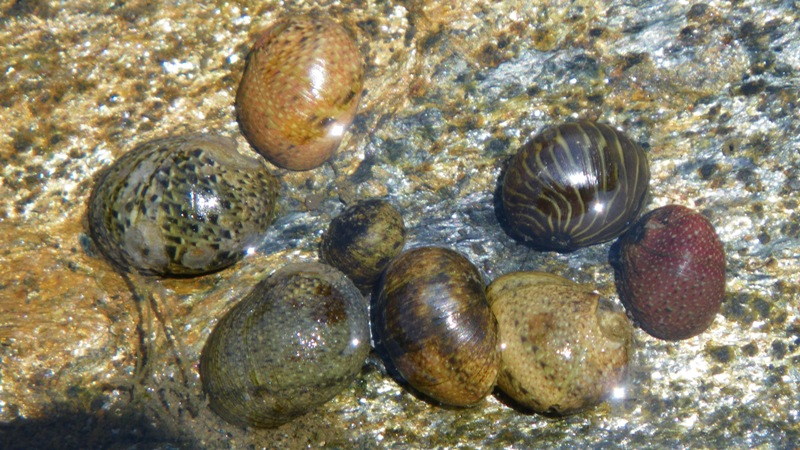

Conservation status
- Least Concern (IUCN 3.1)

Scientific classification
- Kingdom: Animalia
- Phylum: Mollusca
- Class: Gastropoda
- Order: Cycloneritida
- Family: Neritidae
- Genus: Clithon
- Species: C. faba

Binomial name
- Clithon faba Sowerby I, 1836

Synonyms
- Clithon (Clithon) faba (G.B. Sowerby I, 1836) (new combination); Nerita interrupta Récluz, 1843; Neritina faba G. B. Sowerby I, 1836 (original combination); Neritina faba var. fasciata E. von Martens, 1878 (junior synonym); Neritina faba var. sagittata E. von Martens, 1878 (junior synonym); Neritina faba var. strigosa E. von Martens, 1878 (junior synonym); Neritina fasciata Martens, 1878 (junior synonym); Neritina interrupta G. B. Sowerby II, 1849 (probable synonym); Neritina sagittata Martens, 1878 (junior synonym); Neritina strigosa Martens, 1878; Neritina troscheli Récluz, 1850 (a junior synonym)

= Clithon faba =

Species of gastropod

Clithon faba is a species of brackish water snail with an operculum, a nerite. It is an aquatic gastropod mollusc in the family Neritidae, the nerites.

== Distribution ==
This species occurs in the Philippines, Singapore and in Japan: Honshū and Kyūshū, Vietnam.

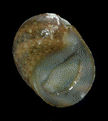
Clithon faba shell.
