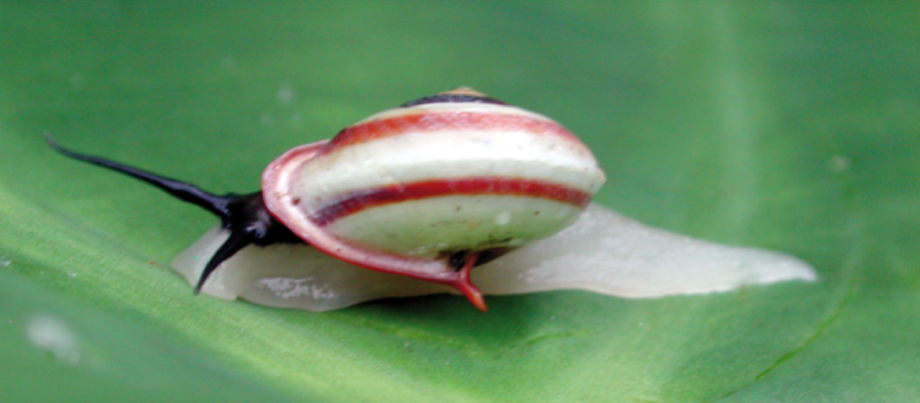

Scientific classification
- Kingdom: Animalia
- Phylum: Mollusca
- Class: Gastropoda
- Order: Cycloneritida
- Family: Helicinidae
- Genus: Helicina
- Species: H. rhodostoma

Binomial name
- Helicina rhodostoma Gray, 1824

Synonyms
- Helicina goldfussi Boettger, 1887; Helicina rhodostoma inermis A. J. Wagner, 1910

= Helicina rhodostoma =

Species of gastropod

Helicina rhodostoma is a species of tropical land snail with an operculum, a terrestrial gastropod mollusc in the family Helicinidae.

== Shell description ==
Robert John Lechmere Guppy (1868) noted that this species is not found above 1000 m altitude. Three names have been used for this species, but material by Robinson et al. (2009) shows that the forms intergrade, illustrating the variability of the species. In general, populations from higher altitudes have a more pronounced columellar spine, and are more likely to have a red to reddish-orange aperture, as seen in typical Helicina rhodostoma. Populations from drier, coastal areas tend to lack a columellar spine, and the aperture may be white or yellow. Juvenile specimens of this species often have a hairy periostracum, which is gradually worn off as the snail reaches sexual maturity.

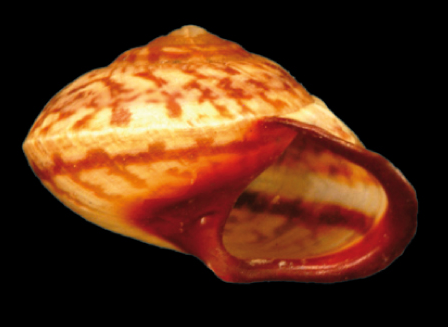
An apertural view of the shell of Helicina rhodostoma. The height of the shell is 6.90 mm.

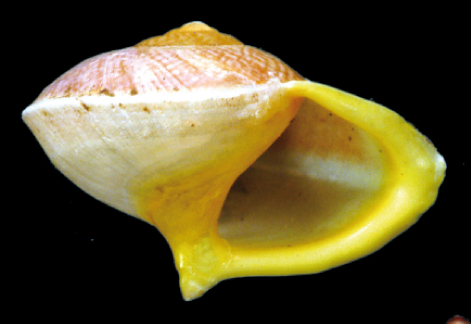
An apertural view of the shell of Helicina rhodostoma. The height of the shell is 9.24 mm. This shell shows the columellar spine.

== Distribution ==
Helicina rhodostoma is endemic to the West Indian island of Dominica.

Despite the fact that Helicina rhodostoma was originally erroneously described from Guadeloupe – and in subsequent reports from that island the error has been perpetuated – this species is undoubtedly a Dominican endemic. It has not been found during subsequent surveys of Guadeloupe and Marie-Galante. The fact that no museum material exists labelled “Guadeloupe”, not even in the Muséum national d'histoire naturelle in Paris, indicates that the species has never been collected on that island. The synonymy of Helicina goldfussi and Helicina rhodostoma inermis is confirmed by morphometrics and anatomical studies.

== Ecology ==
Helicina rhodostoma can be found living on trees, on ferns, and also between rocks and gravel.
