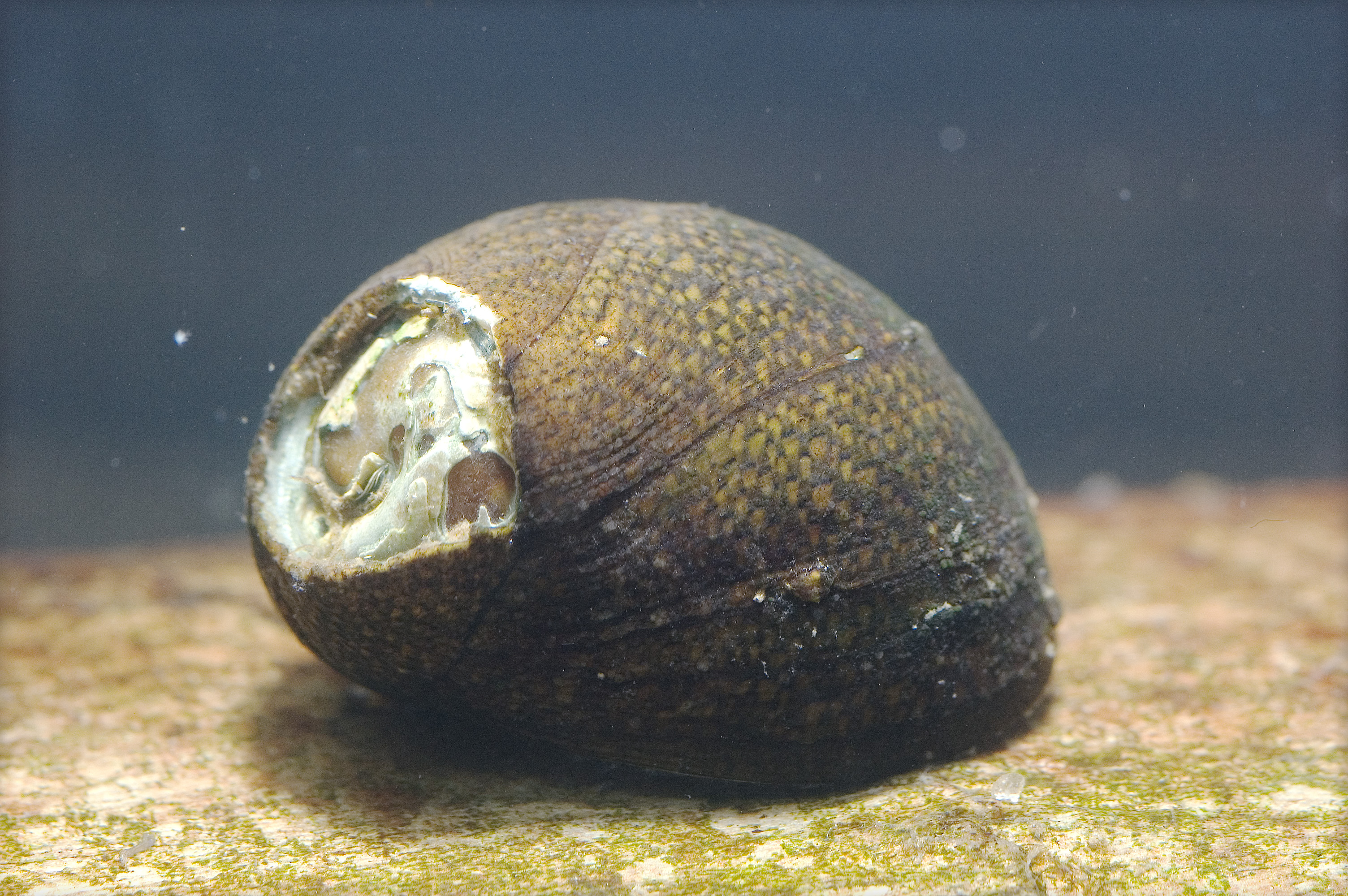
- A live Clithon retropictum

Scientific classification
- Kingdom: Animalia
- Phylum: Mollusca
- Class: Gastropoda
- Order: Cycloneritida
- Family: Neritidae
- Genus: Clithon
- Species: C. retropictum

Binomial name
- Clithon retropictum (von Martens, 1879)

Synonyms
- List: Clithon retropicta (von Martens, 1878); Clithon retropictus (incorrect gender ending); Neritina nubila (von Martens, 1860); Neritina obtusa (Reeve, 1855); Neritina retropicta (von Martens, 1879)

= Clithon retropictum =

Species of gastropod

Clithon retropictum (Korean: 기수갈고둥, Japanese: 石蜑螺) is a species of freshwater and brackish water snail with an operculum. It is an aquatic gastropod in the family Neritidae.

== Distribution ==
This species occurs on the Japanese islands of Honshu, Kyushu, and Shikoku. It also occurs on the South Korean island of Jeju, and in Taiwan.

== Description ==
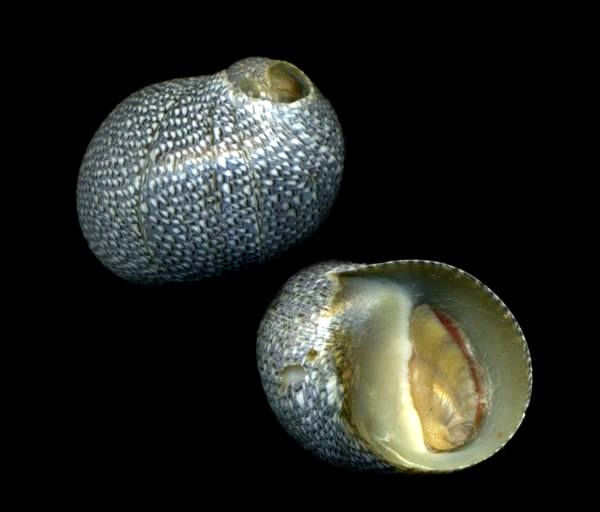
Clithon retropictum shells

== Habitat ==
C. retropictus lives in brackish water and in freshwater.

== Feeding habits ==
Clithon retropictum is an herbivorous species.

== Life cycle ==
C. retropictum is oviparous. Juveniles hatch from eggs in September. The lifespan of C. retropictum is up to 12 years and it is one of the most long-lived freshwater gastropods.

== Parasites ==
- Vibrio parahaemolyticus

== Status ==
The species is considered as a second grade endangered species by the Korean Ministry of Environment.
