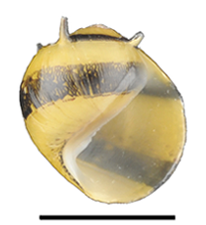
- Apertural view of Clithon diadema shell. Scale bar is 10 mm.
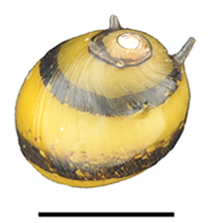
- Abapertural view of Clithon diadema shell. Scale bar is 10 mm.

Scientific classification
- Kingdom: Animalia
- Phylum: Mollusca
- Class: Gastropoda
- Order: Cycloneritida
- Family: Neritidae
- Genus: Clithon
- Species: C. diadema

Binomial name
- Clithon diadema (Récluz, 1841)

Synonyms
- Nerita cardinalis Le Guillou, 1841; Nerita diadema Récluz, 1841 (original combination); Nerita michaudi Récluz, 1841; Nerita (Clithon) donovani Récluz, 1843; Neritella penicillata Gould, 1859; Neritina bifasciata Schepman, 1918; Neritina cyanostoma Morelet, 1853; Neritina donovana G.B. Sowerby II, 1849; Neritina horrida Mabille, 1895; Neritina mutica G.B. Sowerby II, 1849; Neritina pazi Gassies, 1858; Neritina subocellata Schepman, 1885

= Clithon diadema =

Species of gastropod

Clithon diadema is a species of brackish water and freshwater snail with an operculum, a nerite. It is an aquatic gastropod mollusk in the family Neritidae, the nerites.

== Description ==
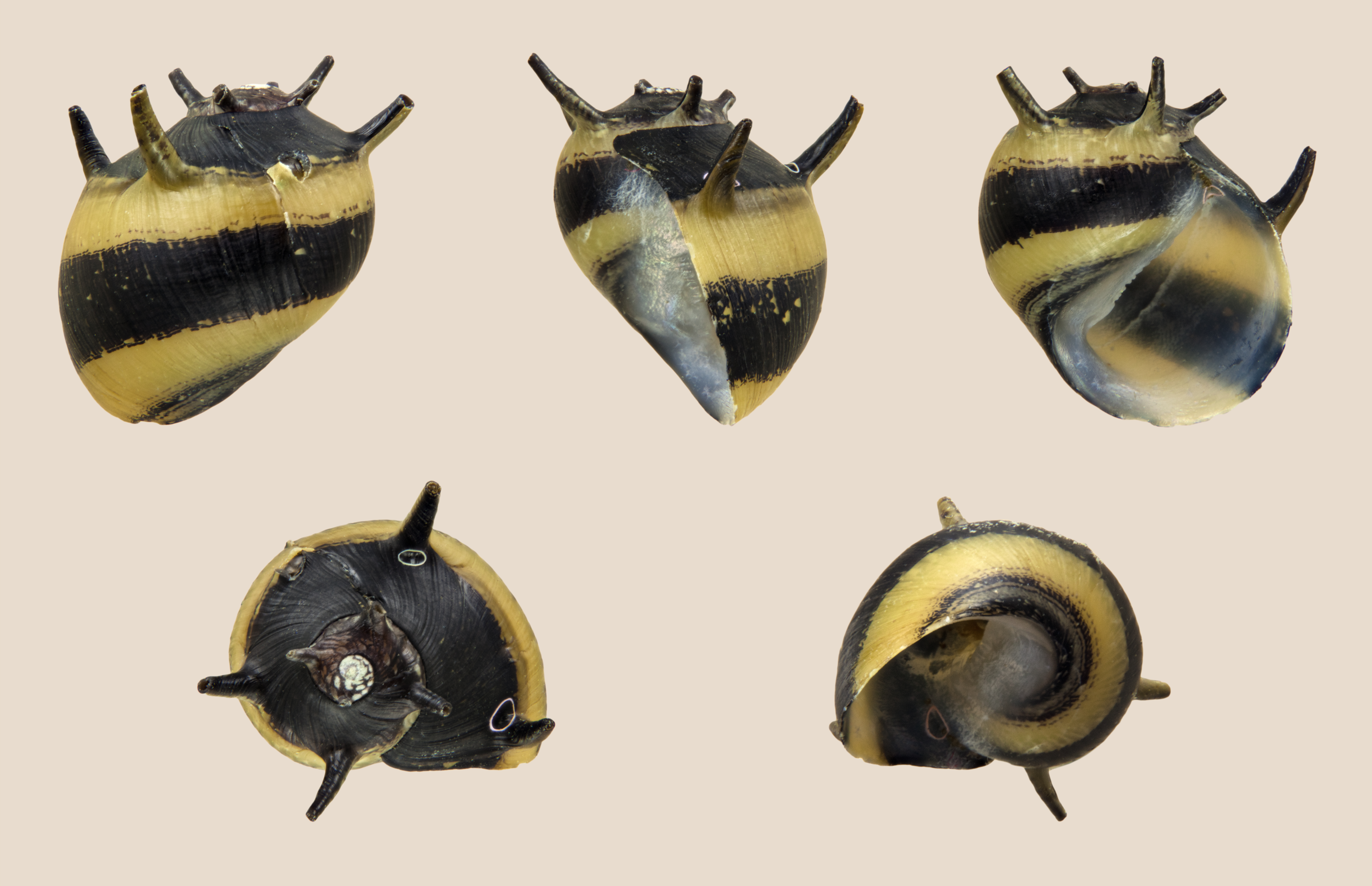
Clithon diadema shell.

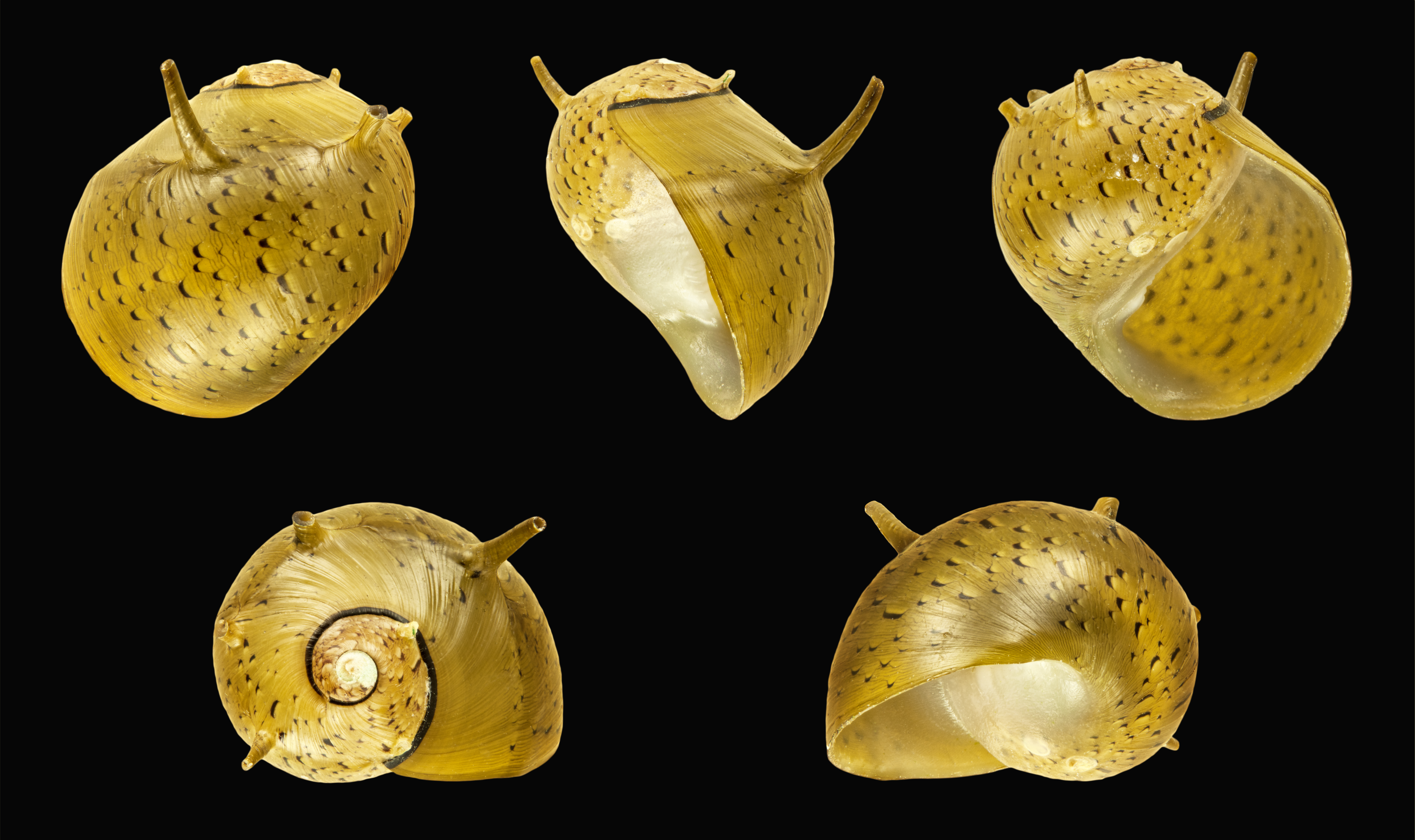
Clithon diadema shell.

== Human use ==
It is a part of ornamental pet trade for freshwater aquaria.
