= Helicina (disambiguation) =

Helicina can refer to two taxa of gastropods:

- Helicina (suborder), a suborder of land snails and slugs also known as Sigmurethra
- Helicina (genus), a genus of land snails
