= H. lutea =

H. lutea may refer to:

- Halichondria lutea, a marine demosponge
- Haliclona lutea, a marine demosponge
- Hamodes lutea, an owlet moth
- Hapsifera lutea, a fungus moth
- Helicina lutea, a land snail
- Hyperythra lutea, a geometer moth
- Hypocrea lutea, a fungus that grows on rotten wood
