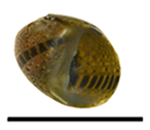
- Apertural view of Clithon mertonianum shell. Scale bar is 10 mm.
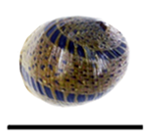
- Abapertural view of Clithon mertonianum shell. Scale bar is 10 mm.

Scientific classification
- Kingdom: Animalia
- Phylum: Mollusca
- Class: Gastropoda
- Order: Cycloneritida
- Family: Neritidae
- Genus: Clithon
- Species: C. mertonianum

Binomial name
- Clithon mertonianum (Récluz, 1843)

Synonyms
- Nerita mertoniana Récluz, 1843

= Clithon mertonianum =

Species of gastropod

Clithon mertonianum is a species of a freshwater snail with an operculum, a nerite. It is an aquatic gastropod mollusk in the family Neritidae, the nerites.

== Human use ==
It is a part of ornamental pet trade for freshwater aquaria.
