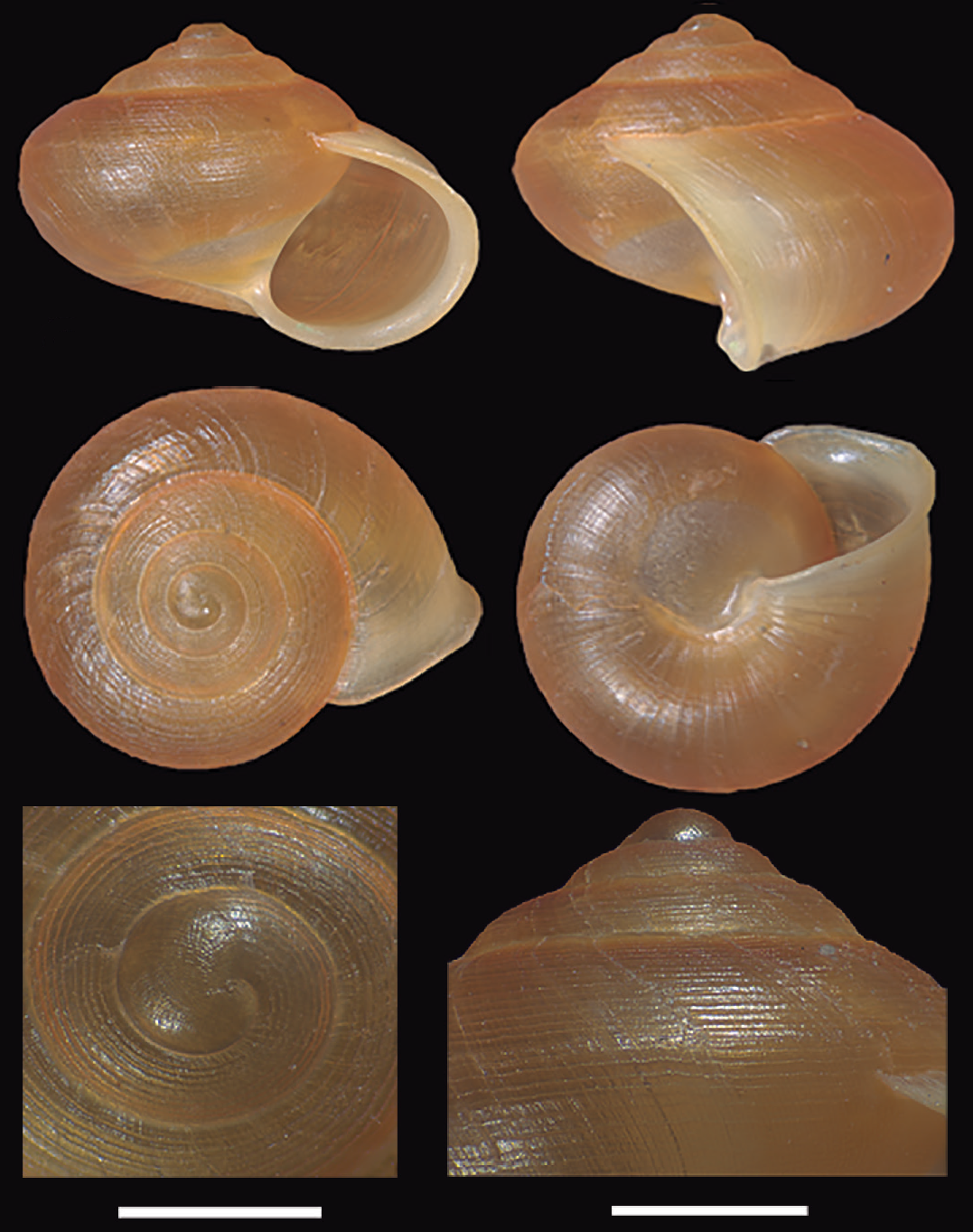
- Different views of a shell of Helicina schereri, from Brazil; top left = apertural view; top right = left lateral view; middle left = apical view; middle right = umbilical view; bottom left = detail of protoconch; bottom right = detail of spire (scale bars = 0.5 mm).

Scientific classification
- Kingdom: Animalia
- Phylum: Mollusca
- Class: Gastropoda
- Order: Cycloneritida
- Family: Helicinidae
- Genus: Helicina
- Species: H. schereri

Binomial name
- Helicina schereri Baker, 1914

= Helicina schereri =

Species of gastropod

Helicina schereri is a species of tropical land snail with an operculum, a terrestrial gastropod mollusc in the family Helicinidae.

== Distribution ==
This species lives in Brazil.
