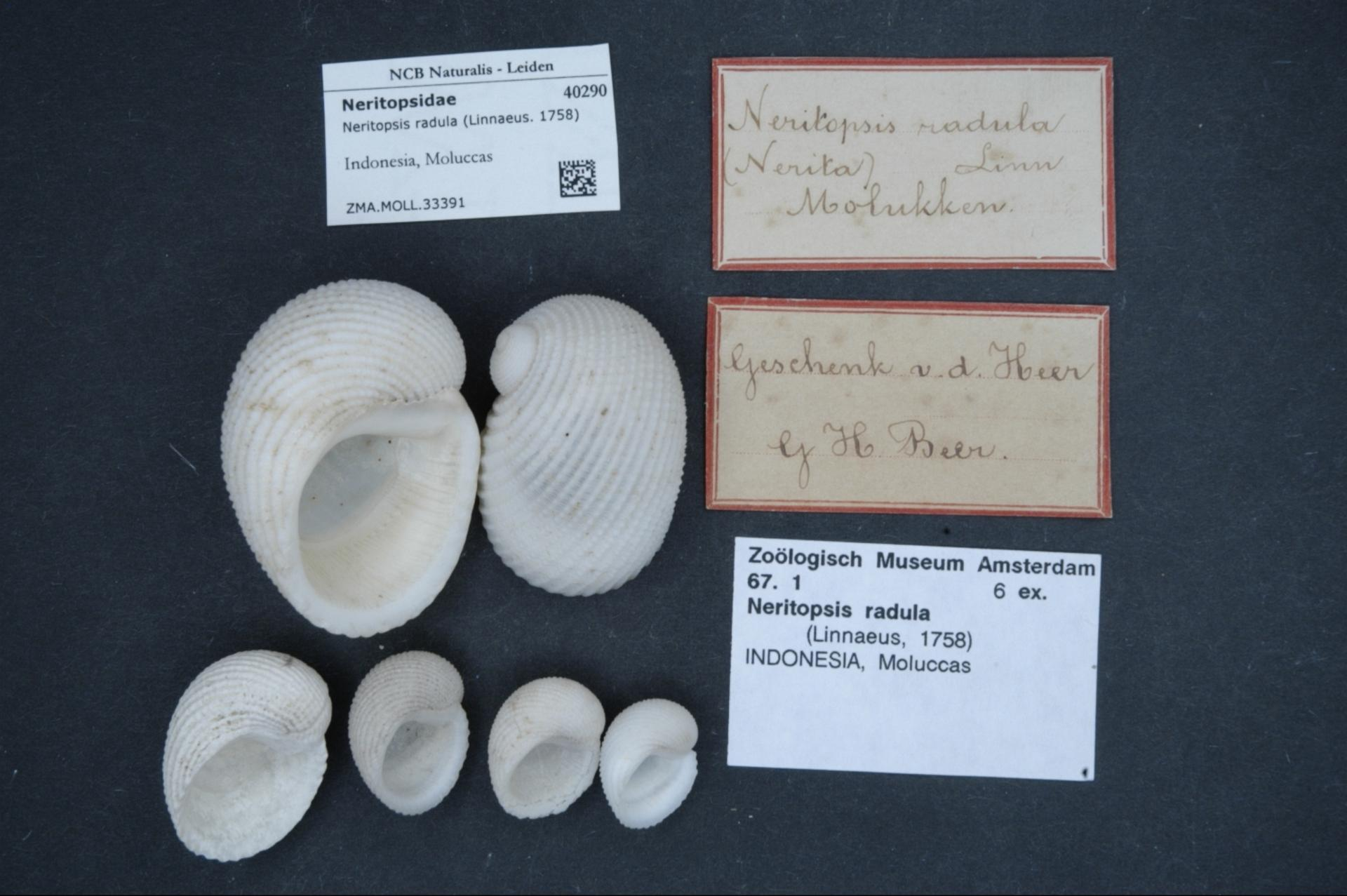
- Neritopsis radula shells

Scientific classification
- Kingdom: Animalia
- Phylum: Mollusca
- Class: Gastropoda
- Order: Cycloneritida
- Superfamily: Neritopsoidea; Gray, 1847

Families
- See text.

= Neritopsoidea =

Superfamily of gastropods

Neritopsoidea is a taxonomic grouping, a superfamily of sea snails, marine gastropod mollusks in the clade Cycloneritimorpha, within the clade Neritimorpha, (according to Bouchet & Rocroi, 2005), or in the order Neritoina within superorder Cycloneritimorpha within the subclass Neritimorpha, (according to Bandel, 2007).

== Taxonomy ==
=== 1997 taxonomy ===
Neritopsoidea was placed in the order Neritoida, the superorder Neritopsina and the subclass Orthogastropoda according to the taxonomy of the Gastropoda by Ponder & Lindberg, 1997.

=== 2005 taxonomy ===
This family consists of the following six families (according to the taxonomy of the Gastropoda by Bouchet & Rocroi, 2005):

- family Neritopsidae
- † family Cortinellidae
- † family Delphinulopsidae
- † family Plagiothyridae
- † family Pseudorthonychiidae
- family Titiscaniidae

=== 2007 taxonomy ===
Bandel (2007) described four new families in the Neritopsoidea:

Superfamily Neritopsoidea

- family Neritopsidae
- † Fedaiellidae Bandel, 2007
- † family Delphinulopsidae
- † family Cortinellidae
- † Palaeonaricidae Bandel, 2007
- † Naticopsidae - Bandel (2007) recognizes Natisopsinae (in Neritopsidae by Bouchet & Rocrois 2005) at family level.
- † Tricolnaticopsidae Bandel, 2007
- † Scalaneritinidae Bandel, 2007
- † family Plagiothyridae
- † family Pseudorthonychiidae
- family Titiscaniidae
