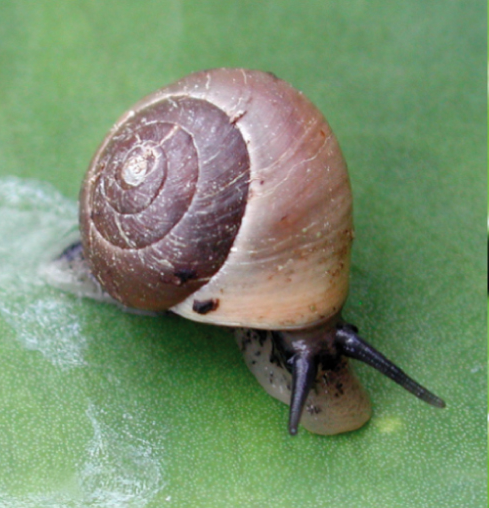

Scientific classification
- Kingdom: Animalia
- Phylum: Mollusca
- Class: Gastropoda
- Order: Cycloneritida
- Family: Helicinidae
- Genus: Helicina
- Species: H. platychila

Binomial name
- Helicina platychila (Megerle von Mühlfeld, 1824)

Synonyms
- Helix platychilos Megerle von Mühlfeld, 1824; Helicina lutea Sowerby II, 1847; Helicina epistilia Guppy, 1868

= Helicina platychila =

Species of gastropod

Helicina platychila is a species of tropical land snail with an operculum, a terrestrial gastropod mollusc in the family Helicinidae.

The description of Helicina epistilia Guppy, 1868 matches this species, and these names are therefore considered synonyms.

== Shell description ==
As in many helicinid species, the shell of Helicina platychila can be yellow, to red, to brown in colour.

== Distribution ==
This species lives in Guadeloupe, Dominica and in Martinique.

The type locality is Guadeloupe.

== Ecology ==
Helicina platychila is fairly common arboreally on branches and leaf surfaces, and between detritus and leaves on the ground, occasionally together with Helicina guppyi in Dominica.
