= Clithon coronatum =

Scientific classification
- Kingdom: Animalia
- Phylum: Mollusca
- Class: Gastropoda
- Order: Cycloneritida
- Family: Neritidae
- Genus: Clithon
- Species: C. coronatum

Binomial name
- Clithon coronatum (Leach, 1815)

Species of gastropod

Clithon coronatum is a species of sea snail, a marine gastropod mollusk in the family Neritidae.
