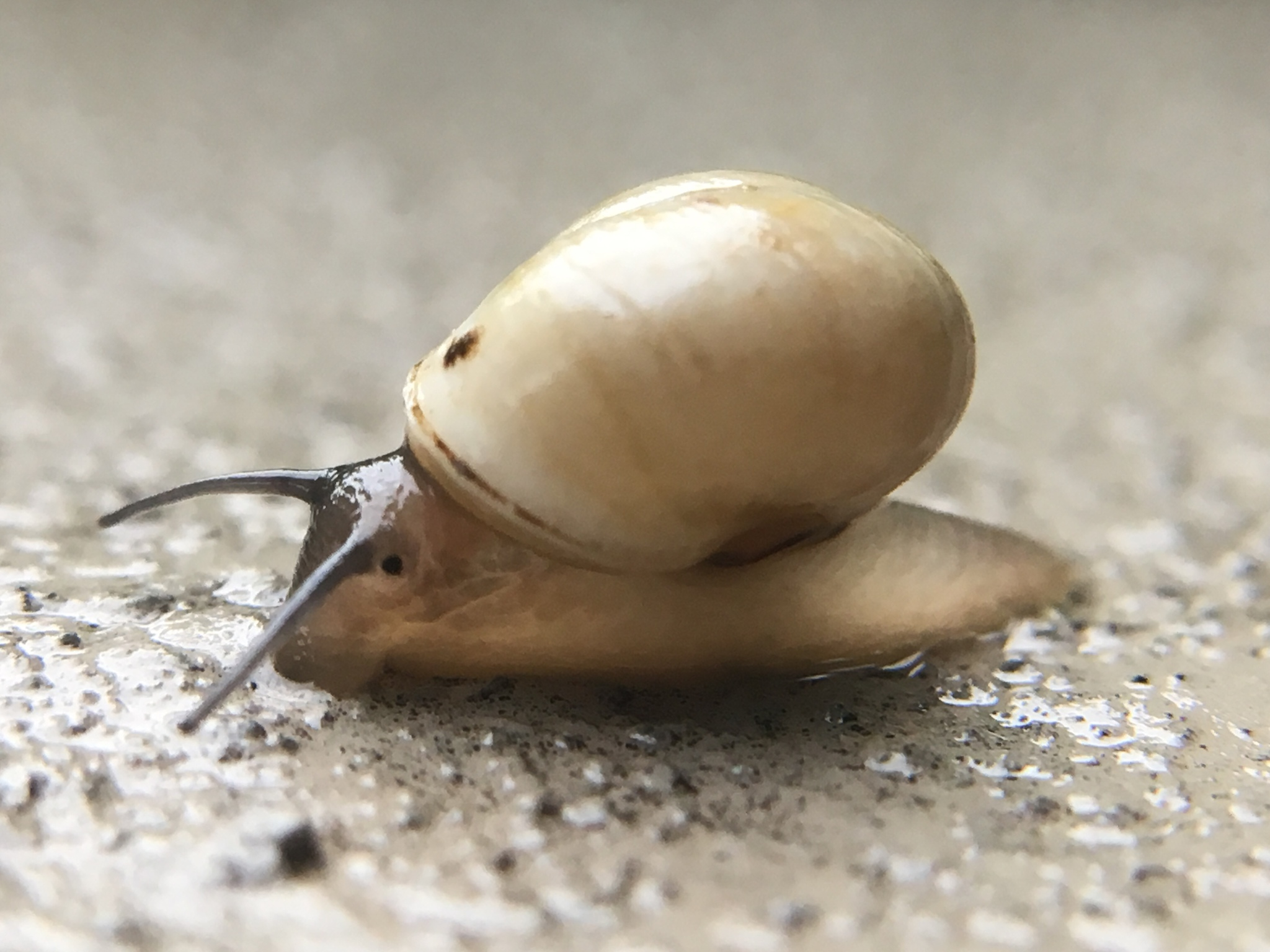

Conservation status
- Secure (NatureServe)

Scientific classification
- Kingdom: Animalia
- Phylum: Mollusca
- Class: Gastropoda
- Order: Cycloneritida
- Family: Helicinidae
- Genus: Helicina
- Species: H. orbiculata

Binomial name
- Helicina orbiculata (Say, 1818)

Synonyms
- Helicina (Oligyra) orbiculata (Say, 1818); Helicina hanleyana Pfeiffer, 1849; Helicina suborbiculata Wagner, 1910; Helicina subtropica Averill, 1886; Oligyra orbiculata Say, 1818; Olygyra orbiculata Say, 1818

= Helicina orbiculata =

Species of gastropod

Helicina orbiculata is a species of land snail with an operculum, a terrestrial gastropod mollusk in the family Helicinidae.

== Distribution ==
This species lives in north-eastern Mexico, Texas, and Florida; especially the northern half of the Florida panhandle, and the central part of Texas, or the parts with a more tropical/subtropical climate. They will survive in areas that have occasional freezes, most likely by burrowing and resurfacing when the ground saturates in the spring. They are drought tolerant but less so than some more well known (although larger) terrestrial snail species.
