= Delphinulopsidae =

Scientific classification
- Kingdom: Animalia
- Phylum: Mollusca
- Class: Gastropoda
- Order: Cycloneritida
- Superfamily: Neritopsoidea
- Family: †Delphinulopsidae; Blodgett, Frýda & Stanley, 2001

Subgroups
- See text.

Extinct family of gastropods

Delphinulopsidae is an extinct taxonomic family of fossil sea snails, marine, gastropod mollusks.

== Taxonomy ==
According to taxonomy of the Gastropoda by Bouchet & Rocroi (2005) the family Delphinulopsidae has no subfamilies.

=== 2007 taxonomy ===
The following two subfamilies have been recognized in Delphinulopsidae by Bandel (2007):

- subfamily Delphinulopsinae Blodgett, Frýda & Stanley, 2001
- subfamily Platychilininae Bandel, 2007

=== Genera ===
Genera within Delphinulopsidae include:

Delphinulopsinae

- Delphinulopsis Laube, 1868 - type genus
  - Delphinulopsis binodosa (Münster, 1841) - type species
- Schwardtopsis Bandel, 2007
  - Schwardtopsis münsteri (Klipstein, 1843) - synonym: Fossariopsis münsteri (Klipstein, 1843) - type species

Platychilininae

- Platychilina Koken, 1892 - type genus
  - Platychilina pustulosa Münster, 1841
  - Platychilina wöhrmanni Koken, 1892 - type species
- Marmolatella Kittl, 1894
  - Marmolatella ampliata
  - Marmolatella stomatia - synonym: Ostrea stomatia Stoppani, 1858 - type species
  - Marmolatella fenestrata (Laube, 1869)
