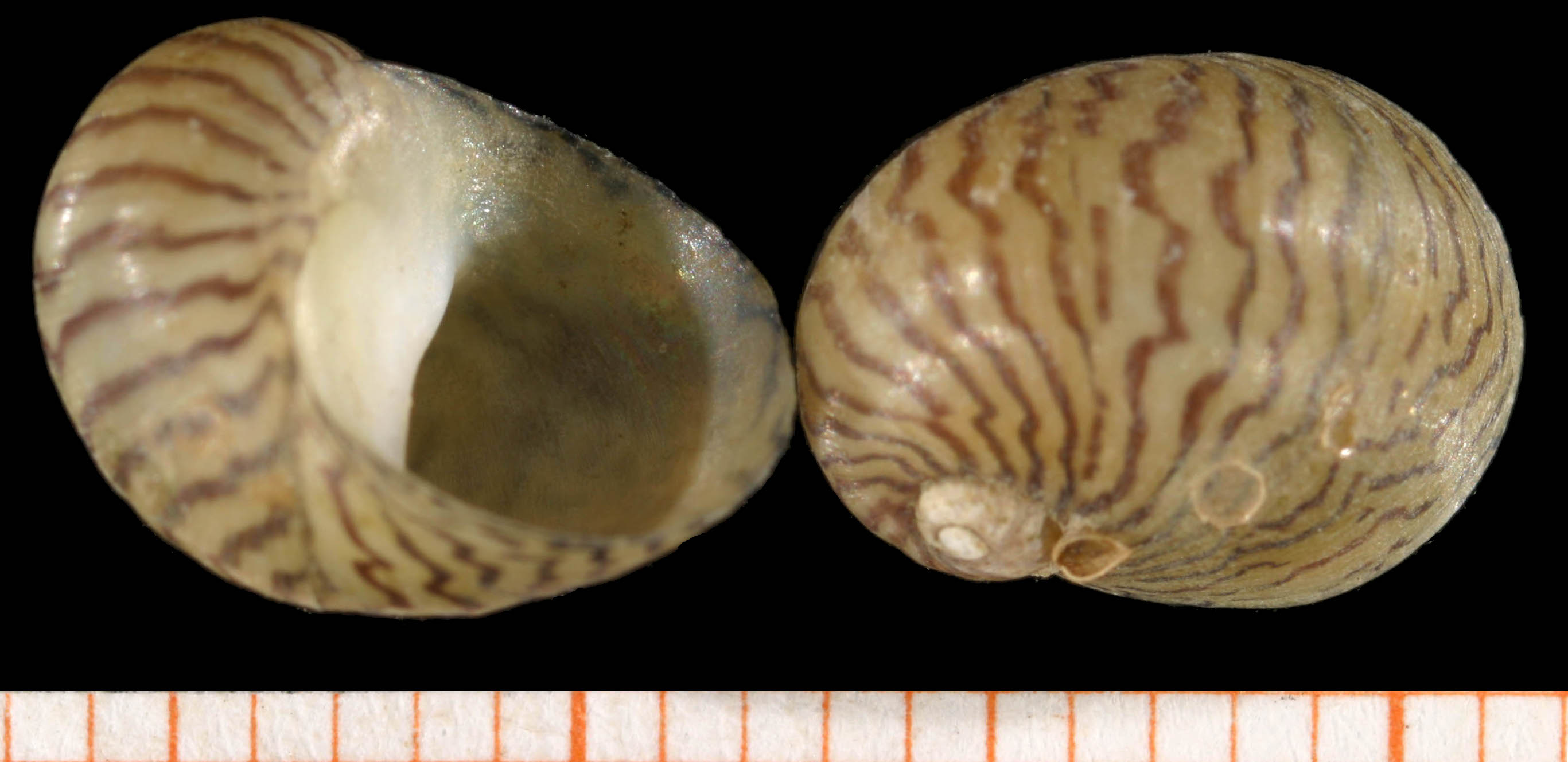
- Two different views of shells of the freshwater nerite Theodoxus danubialis

Scientific classification
- Kingdom: Animalia
- Phylum: Mollusca
- Class: Gastropoda
- Order: Cycloneritida
- Superfamily: Neritoidea; Rafinesque, 1815

Families
- See text

= Neritoidea =

Superfamily of gastropods

Neritoidea is a taxonomic superfamily of mostly sea snails, nerites and their allies, marine gastropod mollusks in the order Cycloneritida (according to the taxonomy of the Gastropoda by Bouchet & Rocroi, 2005).

Previously this superfamily was in the order Neritoida in the superorder Neritopsina.

== Families ==
Families within the superfamily Neritoidea are as follows (according to the taxonomy of the Gastropoda by Bouchet & Rocroi, 2005):

- † Cortinellidae Bandel, 2000
- † Neridomidae Bandel, 2008
- † Neritariidae Wenz, 1938
- Neritidae, the nerites, freshwater and marine species
- † Otostomidae Bandel, 2008
- † Parvulatopsidae Gründel, Keupp & Lang, 2015
- Phenacolepadidae Pilsbry, 1895, false limpets
- † Pileolidae Bandel, Gründel & P. A. Maxwell, 2000

Synonyms

- Protoneritidae Kittl, 1899 †: synonym of Neritinae Rafinesque, 1815
- Scutellidae Angas, 1871: synonym of Phenacolepadidae Pilsbry, 1895 (invalid: type genus a junior homonym)
- Scutellinidae Dall, 1889: synonym of Phenacolepadidae Pilsbry, 1895 (invalid: type genus a junior homonym)
- Septariidae Jousseaume, 1894: synonym of Neritidae Rafinesque, 1815 (a junior synonym)
- Shinkailepadidae Okutani, Saito & Hashimoto, 1989: synonym of Shinkailepadinae Okutani, Saito & Hashimoto, 1989
