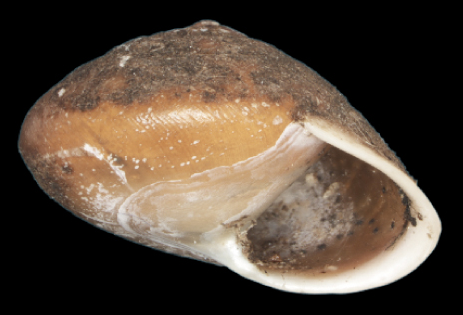
- An apertural view of the shell of Helicina guppyi. Note the presence of the operculum. The height of the shell is 5.99 mm.

Scientific classification
- Kingdom: Animalia
- Phylum: Mollusca
- Class: Gastropoda
- Order: Cycloneritida
- Family: Helicinidae
- Genus: Helicina
- Species: H. guppyi

Binomial name
- Helicina guppyi Pease, 1871

Synonyms
- Helicina humilis Guppy, 1868; Helicina velutina Guppy, 1868

= Helicina guppyi =

Species of gastropod

Helicina guppyi is a species of tropical land snail with an operculum, a terrestrial gastropod mollusk in the family Helicinidae.

== Shell description ==
The species is smaller and lower-spired than the other Dominican Helicina species, and always has a dull brown colour, a paler aperture and a hairy periostracum; ‘covered with a velvety epidermis’, weakly keeled, with a columellar denticle. Its size is 5-8.5 mm.

== Distribution ==
This species lives in Guadeloupe, Dominica and in Martinique.

This is the most common of the helicinids in Dominica, but generally restricted to the leeward side of the island.

== Taxonomy ==
Robert John Lechmere Guppy (1868) described two taxa from Dominica based on shell variation within this species; both names were preoccupied. William Harper Pease (1871) provided a substitute name in his treatment of Indo-Pacific species. This species was placed in the subgenus Striatemoda by Horace Burrington Baker (1940) based on Guppy’s (1868) comparison with the Puerto Rican Alcadia subfusca (Menke, 1828), and also on Pilsbry’s (1892) erroneous placement of this species with the Hispaniolan Alcadia rufa (L. Pfeiffer, 1857). There is expected the forthcoming revision of the Lesser Antillean Helicinidae by Ira Richling (from Kiel, Germany).

== Ecology ==
This species is usually collected on the trunks of trees, where it is well camouflaged on tree bark, or among detritus and leaves on the ground.
