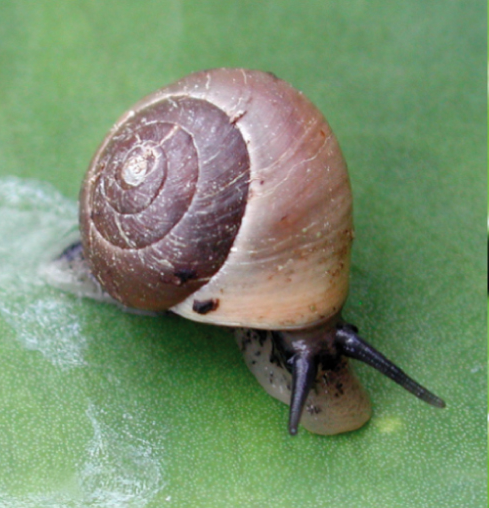
- Helicina platychila
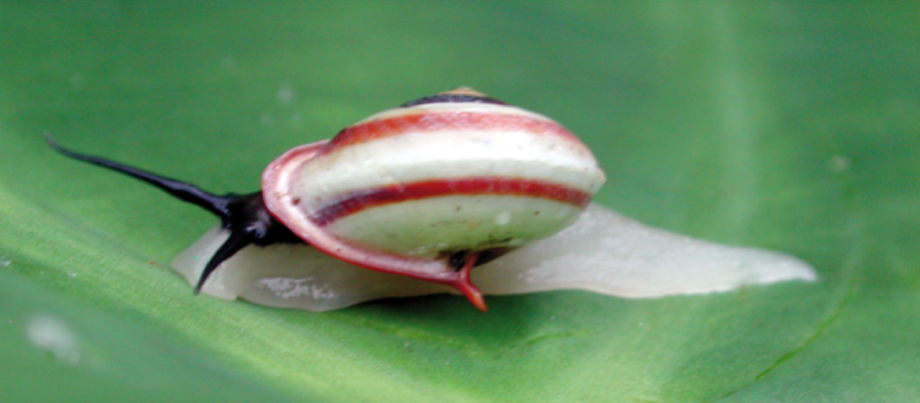
- Helicina rhodostoma

Scientific classification
- Kingdom: Animalia
- Phylum: Mollusca
- Class: Gastropoda
- Order: Cycloneritida
- Superfamily: Helicinoidea
- Family: Helicinidae
- Genus: Helicina; Lamarck, 1799

Type species
- Helicina neritella Lamarck, 1801

Synonyms
- List: Caloplisma Crosse & P. Fischer, 1893; Cinctella A. J. Wagner, 1910; Concentrica A. J. Wagner, 1905; Helicina (Analcadia) A. J. Wagner, 1907; Helicina (Gemma) A. J. Wagner, 1907; Helicina (Helicina) Lamarck, 1799; Helicina (Oligyra) Say, 1818; Helicina (Oxyrhombus) Crosse & P. Fischer, 1893; Helicina (Pseudoligyra) H. B. Baker, 1954; Helicina (Retorquata) A. J. Wagner, 1905; Helicina (Succincta) A. J. Wagner, 1905; Helicina (Tristramia) Crosse, 1863; Helicina (Trochatella) Swainson, 1840; Oligyra Say, 1818; Olygyra Say, 1818; Orbiculata A. J. Wagner, 1905; Pachytoma Swainson, 1840; Pitonellus [lapsus]; Pitonnillus Montfort, 1810; Punctisalcata A. J. Wagner, 1905; Retorquata A. J. Wagner, 1905; Rostrata A. J. Wagner, 1905; Trochatella Swainson, 1840; Turbinata A. J. Wagner, 1905

= Helicina =

Genus of gastropods

Helicina is a genus of tropical and subtropical land snails with an operculum, terrestrial gastropod mollusks.

This is the type genus of its family (Helicinidae) and subfamily (Helicinae), as well as the superfamily Helicinoidea. This radiation is considered a fairly close relative e.g. of the water-living nerites (Neritidae), among the rather primitive snail clade Neritimorpha to which these all belong.

== Species ==
The following species are recognised in the genus Helicina:

- Helicina acobambensis Pilsbry, 1949
- Helicina adspersa L. Pfeiffer, 1839
- Helicina amoena L. Pfeiffer, 1849
- Helicina ampliata C. B. Adams, 1850
- Helicina anaguana Weinland, 1880
- Helicina angulata G. B. Sowerby II, 1842
- Helicina antillarum G. B. Sowerby II, 1842
- Helicina arenicola Morelet, 1849
- Helicina basifilaris Preston, 1914
- Helicina bautistae A. J. Wagner, 1910
- Helicina beatrix Angas, 1879
- Helicina besckei L. Pfeiffer, 1849
- Helicina biangulata L. Pfeiffer, 1851
- Helicina bicincta Gloyne, 1872
- Helicina bicolor L. Pfeiffer, 1854
- Helicina bocourti Crosse & P. Fischer, 1869
- Helicina boettgeri A. J. Wagner, 1910
- Helicina borealis E. von Martens, 1890
- Helicina bourguignatiana Ancey, 1892
- Helicina brasiliensis Gray, 1824
- Helicina cacaguelita Pilsbry & G. H. Clapp, 1902
- Helicina caracolla S. Moricand, 1836
- Helicina carinata A. d'Orbigny, 1835
- Helicina chionea Pilsbry, 1949
- Helicina chiquitica (Richling, 2001)
- Helicina chrysocheila W. G. Binney, 1851
- Helicina cinctella Shuttleworth, 1852
- Helicina cingulata L. Pfeiffer, 1854
- Helicina clappi Pilsbry, 1909
- Helicina cokevillensis Yen, 1954 †
- Helicina colombiae E. A. Smith, 1878
- Helicina columbiana R. A. Philippi, 1847
- Helicina concentrica L. Pfeiffer, 1849
- Helicina contamanoensis Preston, 1914
- Helicina conus A. J. Wagner, 1910
- Helicina convexa L. Pfeiffer, 1849
- Helicina cordillerae L. Pfeiffer, 1857
- Helicina cretacea Yen, 1954 †
- Helicina crosbyi A. P. Brown, 1913 †
- Helicina cucutensis Pisbry, 1939
- Helicina dallasi (M. A. Hanna, 1927) †
- Helicina declivis L. Pfeiffer & Gundlach, 1860
- Helicina decorosa A. J. Wagner, 1910
- Helicina delicatula Shuttleworth, 1852
- Helicina densestriata A. J. Wagner, 1910
- Helicina diaphana L. Pfeiffer, 1852
- Helicina dominicensis L. Pfeiffer, 1853
- Helicina duo Breure, 2011
- Helicina durangoana Mousson, 1884
- Helicina dysoni L. Pfeiffer, 1849
- Helicina echandiensis Richling, 2004
- Helicina ecuadoriana K. Miller, 1879
- Helicina elata Shuttleworth, 1852
- Helicina elatior E. von Martens, 1890
- Helicina escondida Richling, 2004
- Helicina evanstonensis (C. A. White, 1878) †
- Helicina fasciata Lamarck, 1822
- Helicina faustini Weinland, 1862
- Helicina festiva G. B. Sowerby I, 1839
- Helicina flavida Menke, 1828
- Helicina foveata L. Pfeiffer, 1854
- Helicina fragilis Morelet, 1851
- Helicina fulva A. d'Orbigny, 1835
- Helicina funcki L. Pfeiffer, 1849
- Helicina gabbi Crosse, 1873
- Helicina gemma Preston, 1903
- Helicina ghiesbreghti L. Pfeiffer, 1856
- Helicina grayi Jacobson & Clench, 1971
- Helicina guajarana F. Baker, 1914
- Helicina guppyi Pease, 1871
- Helicina haemastoma S. Moricand, 1838
- Helicina heighwayana Dall, 1909
- Helicina hondurana H. G. Richards, 1938
- Helicina hornbeckii R. A. Philippi, 1847
- Helicina huacapistana Pilsbry, 1949
- Helicina iguapensis Pilsbry, 1900
- Helicina inaequistriata Pilsbry, 1900
- Helicina inca Preston, 1914
- Helicina invectita Pilsbry & Vanatta, 1928
- Helicina iris Weinland, 1862
- Helicina isthmica Pilsbry, 1926
- Helicina juruana von Ihering, 1905
- Helicina keatei L. Pfeiffer, 1857
- Helicina lacerata Preston, 1914
- Helicina laterculus F. Baker, 1914
- Helicina laus A. J. Wagner, 1905
- Helicina lembeyana Poey, 1854
- Helicina leopoldinae A. J. Wagner, 1905
- Helicina leptotropis A. J. Wagner, 1910
- Helicina leucozonalis Ancey, 1892
- Helicina liobasis F. G. Thompson, 1982
- Helicina lirifera Ancey, 1892
- Helicina lundi L. Pfeiffer, 1858
- Helicina marfisae Salvador, F. S. Silva & Bichuette, 2023
- Helicina merdigera L. Pfeiffer, 1855
- Helicina monteiberia Sarasúa, 1976
- Helicina monteverdensis Richling, 2004
- Helicina munda F. Haas, 1951
- Helicina nemoralis Guppy, 1866
- Helicina neritella Lamarck, 1801
- Helicina nesiotica Dall, 1892
- Helicina notata L. Pfeiffer, 1857
- Helicina oaxacana Pilsbry, 1920
- Helicina ocanensis A. J. Wagner, 1905
- Helicina ochsneri Dall, 1917
- Helicina orbiculata (Say, 1818)
- Helicina oskari A. J. Wagner, 1910
- Helicina oweniana L. Pfeiffer, 1849
- Helicina oxyrhyncha Crosse & Debeaux, 1863
- Helicina pandiensis A. J. Wagner, 1905
- Helicina paraensis L. Pfeiffer, 1859
- Helicina peruviana Morelet, 1863
- Helicina phakos A. J. Wagner, 1911
- Helicina phasianella L. Pfeiffer, 1856
- Helicina pitalensis A. J. Wagner, 1910
- Helicina platychila (Megerle von Mühlfeld, 1824)
- Helicina prasinata Jacobson & Clench, 1971
- Helicina psorica Morelet, 1863
- Helicina ptychophora Sykes, 1902
- Helicina pucayaensis Preston, 1914
- Helicina punctisulcata E. von Martens, 1890
- Helicina pygmaea Potiez & Michaud, 1838
- Helicina raresulcata L. Pfeiffer, 1861
- Helicina rawsoni L. Pfeiffer, 1867
- Helicina rhips F. G. Thompson, 1982
- Helicina rhodostoma J. E. Gray, 1824
- Helicina rhynchostoma L. Pfeiffer, 1865
- Helicina riparia L. Pfeiffer, 1854
- Helicina rostrata Morelet, 1849
- Helicina rotundata A. J. Wagner, 1910
- Helicina sanctaemarthae Pilsbry & G. H. Clapp, 1902
- Helicina sanguinea L. Pfeiffer, 1849
- Helicina schereri F. Baker, 1914
- Helicina schlueteri A. J. Wagner, 1905
- Helicina serina Preston, 1914
- Helicina shantungensis Yen, 1969 †
- Helicina sinuosa L. Pfeiffer, 1851
- Helicina siolii F. Haas, 1949
- Helicina sordida P. P. King & Broderip, 1832
- Helicina sowerbyana L. Pfeiffer, 1849
- Helicina sprucei L. Pfeiffer, 1857
- Helicina steindachneri A. J. Wagner, 1905
- Helicina striata Lamarck, 1822
- Helicina subglobulosa Poey, 1852
- Helicina succincta E. von Martens, 1890
- Helicina syngenes Preston, 1914
- Helicina talamancensis (Richling, 2001)
- Helicina tamsiana L. Pfeiffer, 1851
- Helicina tenuis L. Pfeiffer, 1849
- Helicina terryae Rehder, 1940
- Helicina tilei L. Pfeiffer, 1847
- Helicina transparens Weinland, 1862
- Helicina trossula Morelet, 1849
- Helicina turbinata L. Pfeiffer, 1848
- Helicina umbonata Shuttleworth, 1854
- Helicina unizonata F. Haas, 1966
- Helicina vanattae Pilsbry, 1910
- Helicina variabilis J. A. Wagner, 1827
- Helicina viridis Lamarck, 1822
- Helicina vokesi G. D. Hanna, 1936 †
- Helicina wettsteini A. J. Wagner, 1905
- Helicina weyrauchi F. Haas, 1948
- Helicina zephyrina Duclos, 1833
