= Pileolidae =

Pileolidae Temporal range: 167.7–99.6 Ma Bathonian to Late Albian

Scientific classification
- Kingdom: Animalia
- Phylum: Mollusca
- Class: Gastropoda
- Order: Cycloneritida
- Superfamily: Neritoidea
- Family: †Pileolidae; Bandel, Grünndel & Maxwell, 2000

Species
- Pileolus Sowerby I, 1823

Extinct family of gastropods

Pileolidae is an extinct family of fossil sea snails, marine gastropod molluscs. This family is related to the extant family Neritidae, the nerites. The family has no subfamilies according to the taxonomy of the Gastropoda by Bouchet & Rocroi, 2005.

== Genera ==
The genus Pileolus is found in Cretaceous age deposits in Europe, and Jurassic age deposits in New Zealand.
