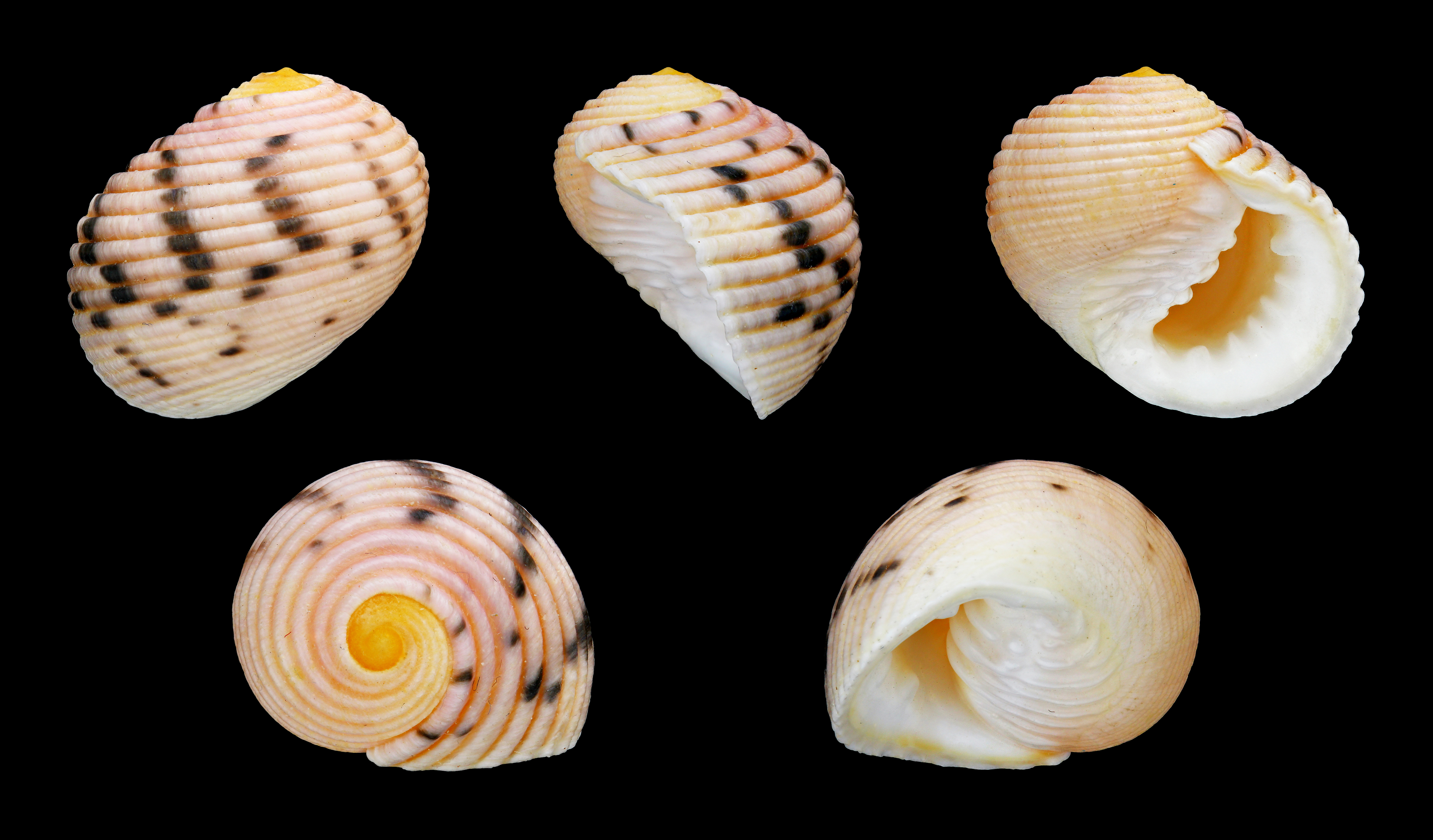
- Five views of a shell of Nerita plicata Linnaeus, 1758

Scientific classification
- Kingdom: Animalia
- Phylum: Mollusca
- Class: Gastropoda
- Order: Cycloneritida
- Family: Neritidae
- Genus: Nerita
- Species: N. plicata

Binomial name
- Nerita plicata Linnaeus, 1758

= Nerita plicata =

Species of gastropod

Nerita plicata is a species of tropical sea snail, a marine gastropod mollusk in the family Neritidae, the nerites. This species is found throughout the Indo-West Pacific.

== Characteristics ==
The Nerita plicata is characterized by its 30 mm shell height with its width being about the same. Their exterior is generally dull white or pink with ribs sometimes being black.

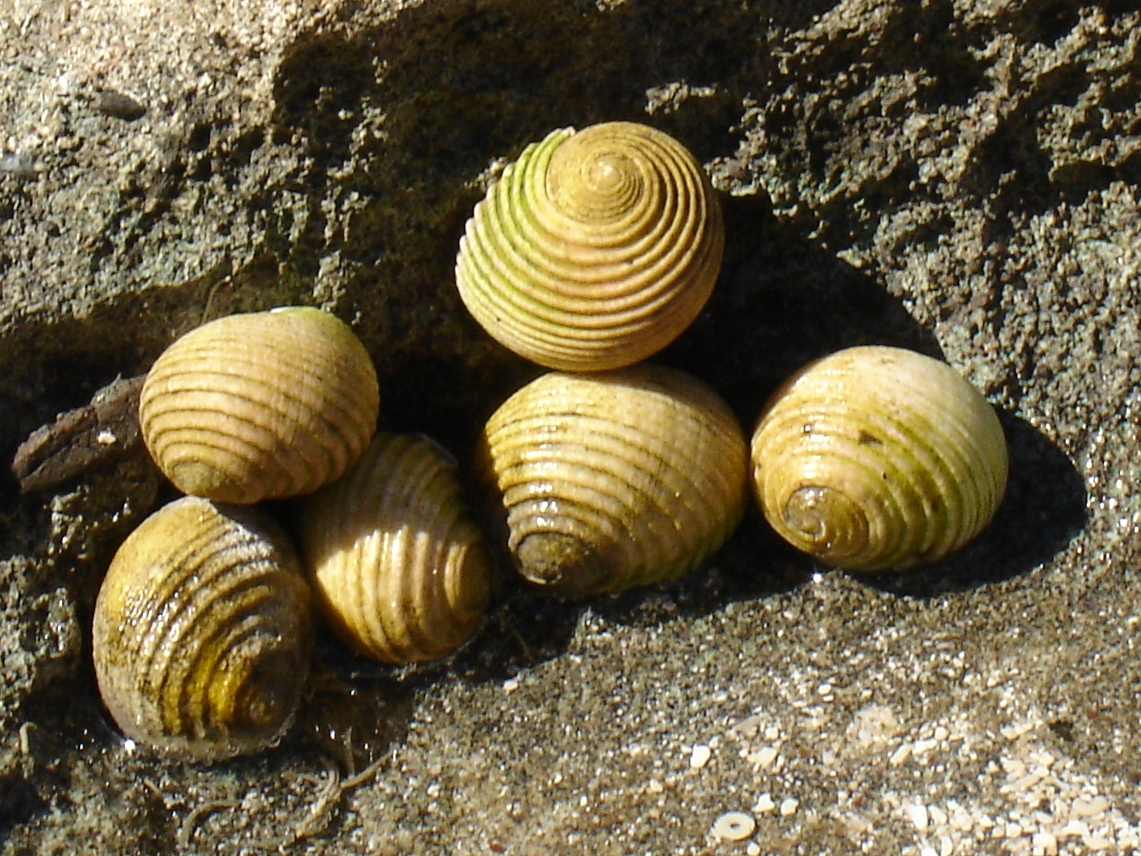
A cluster of Nerita plicata at low tide at Turtle Island, Fiji.

== Habitat ==
This species lives high up in the intertidal zone, on rocks. N. plicata has ridges on its shell that helps it stay cool when exposed at low tide by radiating heat away.

== Reproduction ==
The Nerita plicata reproduces through copulation between male and female. After mating, females will deposit egg capsules which will eventually hatch into larvae.
