= Plagiothyridae =

Scientific classification
- Kingdom: Animalia
- Phylum: Mollusca
- Class: Gastropoda
- Order: Cycloneritida
- Superfamily: Neritopsoidea
- Family: †Plagiothyridae; Knight, 1956

Extinct family of gastropods

Plagiothyridae is an extinct family of fossil sea snails, marine gastropod mollusks in the superfamily Neritopsoidea.

== Genera ==
Genera in the family Plagiothyridae include:

- Dirachis
- Grabinopsis
- Littorinides
- Plagiothyra, the type genus
