= Dawsonellidae =

Scientific classification
- Kingdom: Animalia
- Phylum: Mollusca
- Class: Gastropoda
- Order: Cycloneritida
- Superfamily: Helicinoidea
- Family: †Dawsonellidae; Wenz, 1938

Extinct family of gastropods

Dawsonellidae is an extinct taxonomic family of fossil sea snails, marine, gastropod mollusks.
