= Pseudorthonychiidae =

Scientific classification
- Kingdom: Animalia
- Phylum: Mollusca
- Class: Gastropoda
- Order: Cycloneritida
- Family: †Pseudorthonychiidae
- Genus: †Pseudorthonychia

Extinct genus of gastropods

Pseudorthonychiidae is an extinct, monogeneric (contains only one genus) family of fossil snails, gastropod mollusks in the clade Cycloneritimorpha (according to the taxonomy of the Gastropoda by Bouchet & Rocroi, 2005).

== Genera ==
The sole genus in this family is:

- Pseudorthonychia Bandel & Frýda, 1999
