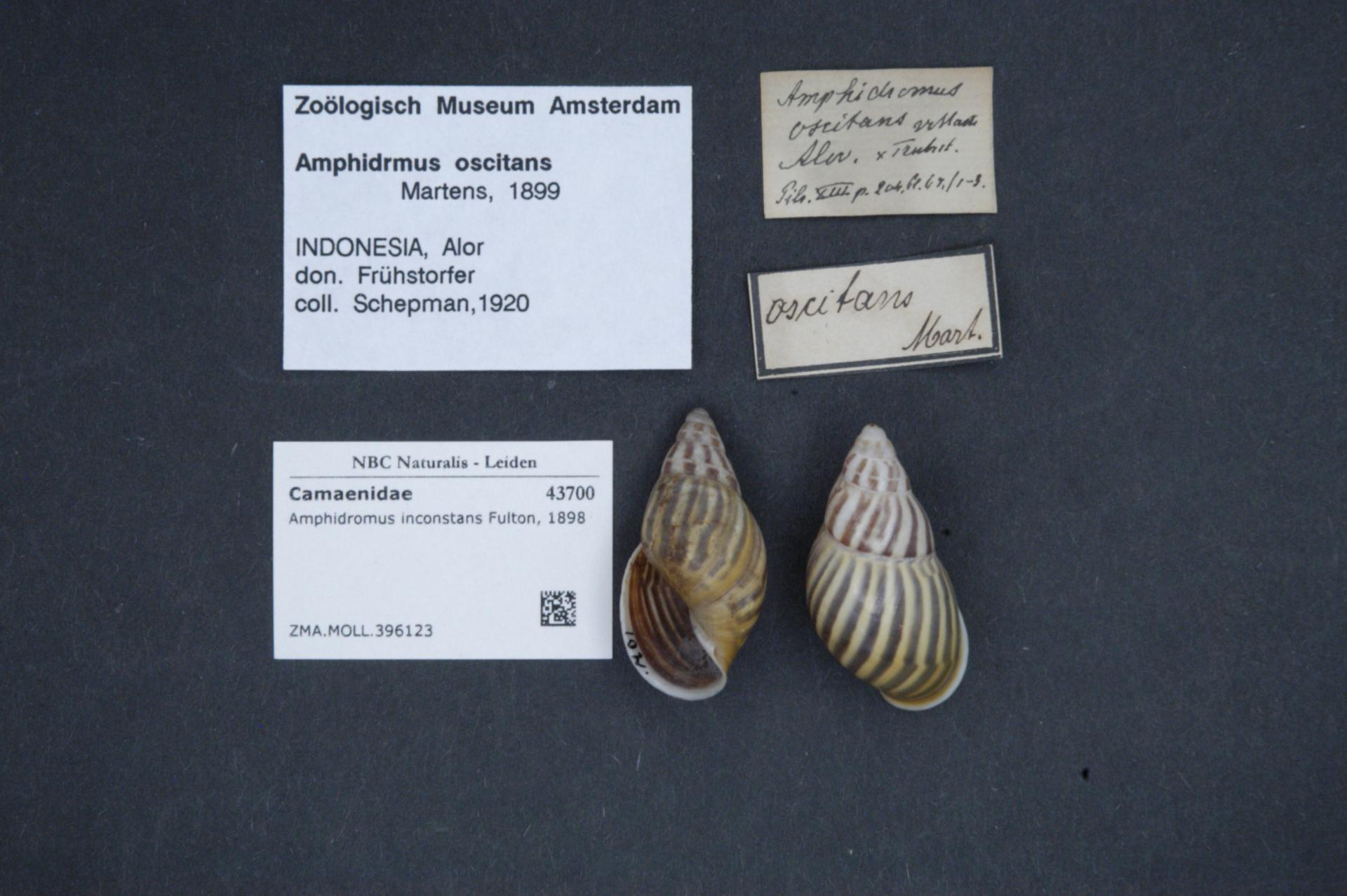
- Shell of Amphidromus inconstans (specimen at Naturalis Biodiversity Center)

Scientific classification
- Kingdom: Animalia
- Phylum: Mollusca
- Class: Gastropoda
- Order: Stylommatophora
- Family: Camaenidae
- Genus: Amphidromus
- Species: A. inconstans

Binomial name
- Amphidromus inconstans Fulton, 1898

Synonyms
- Amphidromus (Syndromus) inconstans Fulton, 1898 alternative representation; Amphidromus oscitans E. von Martens, 1899 junior subjective synonym

= Amphidromus inconstans =

Species of snail in the family Camaenidae

Amphidromus inconstans is a species of medium-sized air-breathing tree snail, an arboreal gastropod mollusk in the family Camaenidae.

Subspecies

- Amphidromus inconstans inconstans Fulton, 1898
- Amphidromus inconstans rollei Laidlaw & Solem, 1961
- Amphidromus inconstans wetaranus F. Haas, 1912
- Amphidromus inconstans var. gracilis Rolle, 1903: synonym of Amphidromus inconstans rollei Laidlaw & Solem, 1961 (invalid; not Fulton, 1896, Martens, 1899, nor Kobelt, 1916)

== Description ==
The length of the shell attains 38 mm, its diameter 19 mm.

(Original description) The sinistral shell is oblong-conic, exhibiting a slight umbilication and a polished surface. Comprising approximately 6.75 convex whorls, it displays somewhat conspicuous, oblique lines of growth. The earlier whorls appear whitish, transitioning to yellow on the lower whorls, which are ornamented with two spiral bands of squarish brown spots. Below these, on the body whorl, lie two narrow, dark-brown bands, the upper situated just below the periphery and the lower approximately 2mm beneath the upper. The columella is white, erect, and rounded. The outer lip appears white, slightly expanded, and depressed at the basal portion where it joins the columella. The parietal callus is quite thin and transparent.

== Habitat ==
This species lives in trees.

== Distribution ==
The type locality of this species is Lesser Sunda Islands, Indonesia.
