= Symmetrocapulidae =

Scientific classification
- Kingdom: Animalia
- Phylum: Mollusca
- Class: Gastropoda
- Order: Cycloneritida
- Superfamily: †Symmetrocapuloidea; Wenz, 1938
- Family: †Symmetrocapulidae; Wenz, 1938

Extinct family of snails

Symmetrocapulidae is an extinct taxonomic family of fossil snails, gastropod mollusks in the monotypic superfamily Symmetrocapuloidea within the clade Cycloneritimorpha.

This superfamily has one family and no subfamilies.

== Genera ==
The type genus is Symmetrocapulus Dacqué, 1934.
