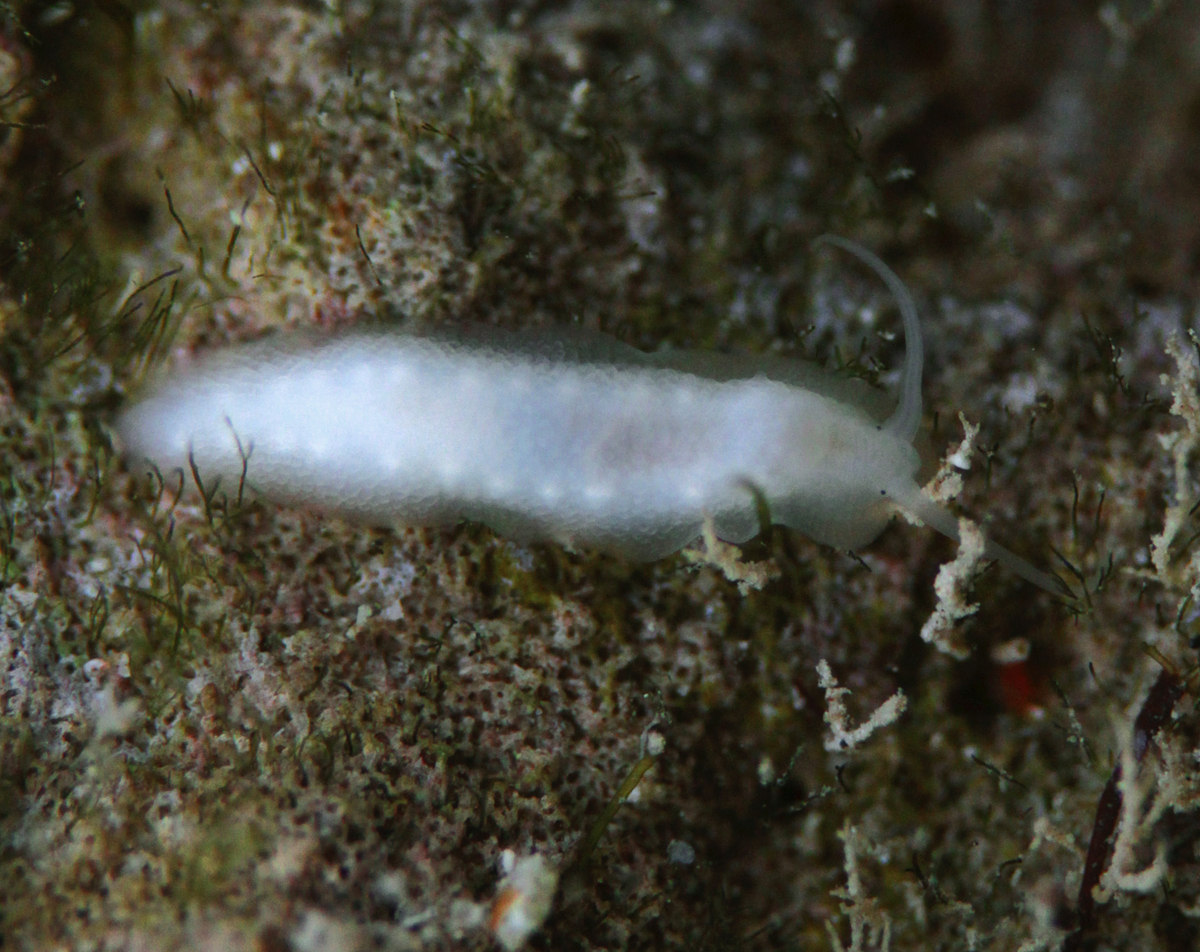
- Titiscania limacina

Scientific classification
- Kingdom: Animalia
- Phylum: Mollusca
- Class: Gastropoda
- Order: Cycloneritida
- Superfamily: Neritopsoidea
- Family: Titiscaniidae; Bergh, 1890
- Genus: Titiscania; Bergh, 1890

Type species
- Titiscania limacina Bergh, 1890

= Titiscania =

Genus of gastropods

Titiscania is a genus of slug-like sea snails, shell-less marine gastropod mollusks in the superfamily Neritopsoidea.

Titiscania is the type genus and also the only genus in the family Titiscaniidae.

The original vernacular spelling "Die Titiscanien" by Rudolph Bergh (1890) was Latinized by Johannes Thiele in 1891.

Excepting some parasitic forms, Titiscania is the only genus of gastropod outside of the Heterobranchia to have secondarily lost its mineralized shell, which it sheds after its larval phase.

When disturbed a bluish white, thread-like substance is discharged through defensive glands in the form of about 12 densely placed white papillae on both sides of the back.

== Species ==
Species within the genus Titiscania include:

- Titiscania limacina Bergh, 1890
- Titiscania shinkishihataii Taki, 1955
