= Cortinellidae =

Scientific classification
- Kingdom: Animalia
- Phylum: Mollusca
- Class: Gastropoda
- Order: Cycloneritida
- Superfamily: Neritopsoidea
- Family: †Cortinellidae

Extinct family of gastropods

Cortinellidae is an extinct taxonomic family of fossil sea snails.
