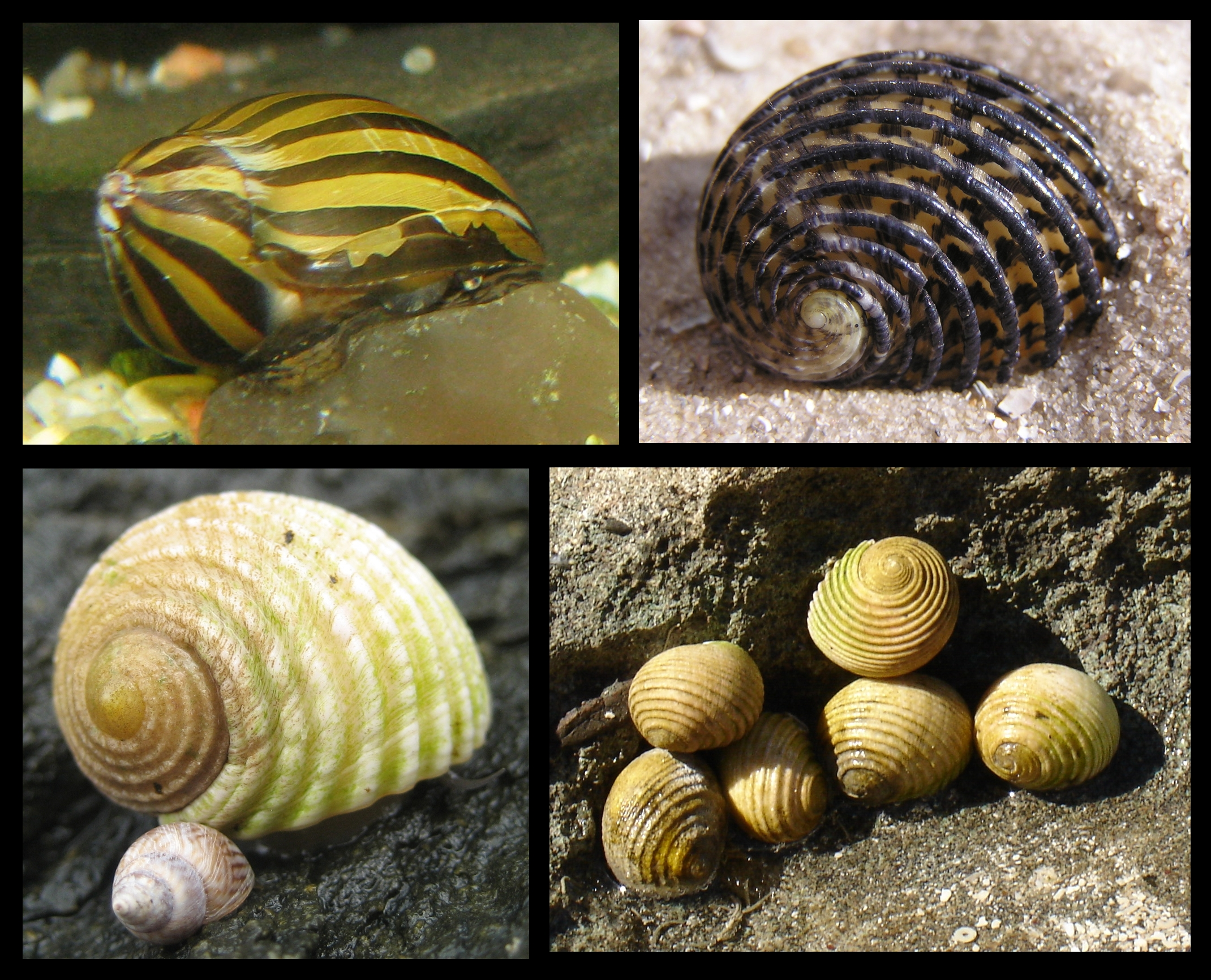
- Examples of Neritimorpha

Scientific classification
- Kingdom: Animalia
- Phylum: Mollusca
- Class: Gastropoda
- Subclass: Neritimorpha

Clades
- See text

Synonyms
- Neritopsina Cox & Knight, 1960

= Neritimorpha =

Neritimorpha Temporal range: Early Ordovician – Recent

Subclass of gastropods

Neritimorpha is a clade of gastropod molluscs that contains around 2,000 extant species of sea snails, limpets, freshwater snails, land snails and slugs. This clade used to be known as the superorder Neritopsina. Nerite snails are popular in the aquarium trade.

== Etymology ==
The clade's name, Neritimorpha, is from the Ancient Greek νηρίτης (nērī́tēs 'Nerite') and μορφή (morphḗ 'form').

== Description ==
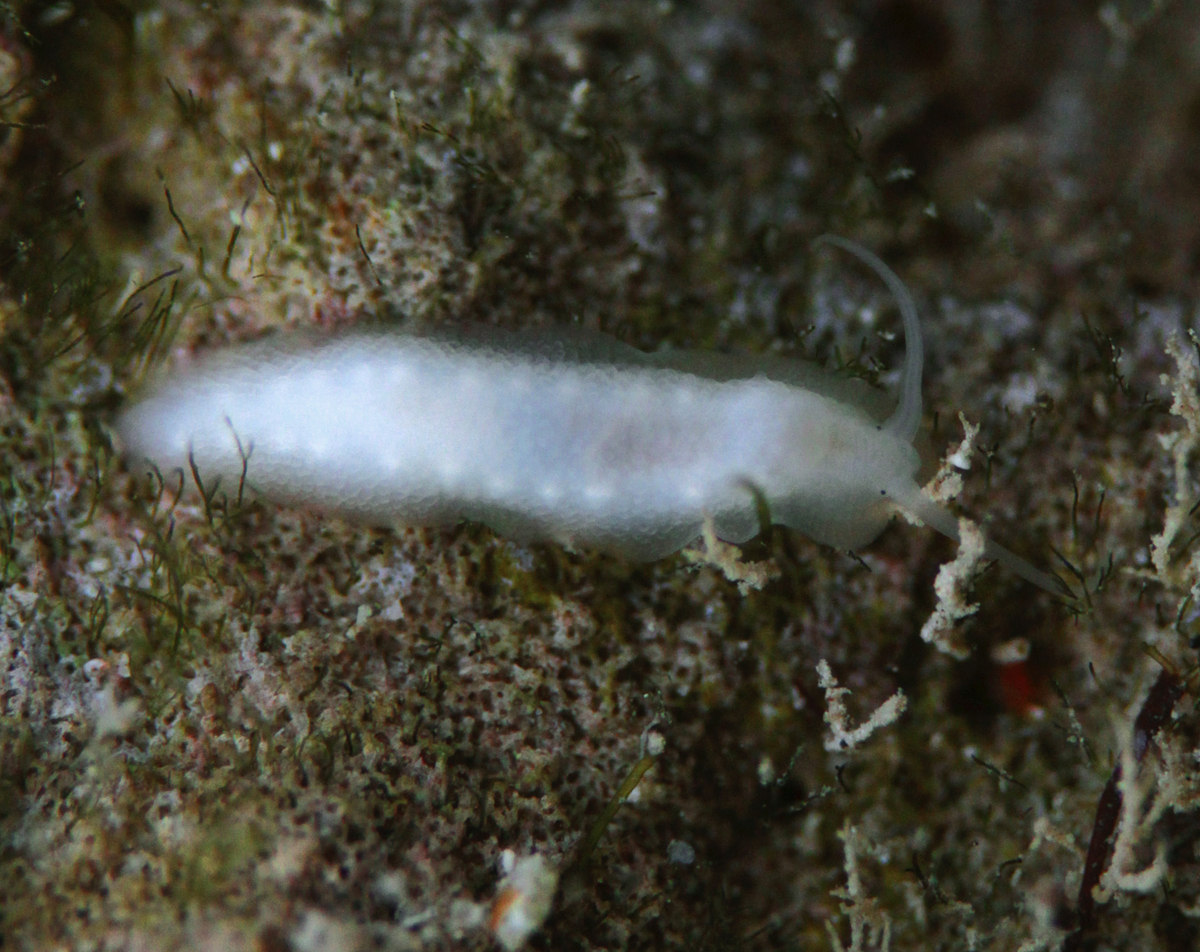
Titiscania, a shellless neritimorph of family Titiscaniidae

Despite their relatively low diversity, with only around 2,000 species, neritomorphs have achieved a remarkable diversity of forms, resembling a smaller-scale version of the diversity achieved by Gastropoda as a whole. Terrestrial lifestyles have evolved at least three separate occasions in neritimorphs: the extinct Dawsonellidae and the extant Helicinidae and Hydrocenidae. Neritimorphs also include the shellless, slug-like Titiscania. In all modern neritomorphs except neritopsids, the inner walls of the protoconch are resorbed.

Unlike most other gastropods, neritomorphs typically have calcified opercula. There is no operculum in the shellless Titiscania, and the Phenacolepadidae have a vestigial, non-calcified operculum that shows no postlarval growth.

== Taxonomy ==
Neritimorpha has an extremely rich geologic history, going back to early Ordovician. This clade has been considered to be a leftover of early gastropod diversification. Neritimorpha is the sister taxon of the Apogastropoda. The clade uniting neritimorphs and apogastropods has been called either Adenogonogastropoda or Angiogastropoda. All modern members of Neritimorpha are classified in the order Cycloneritimorpha. Neritopsoidea was the first of the four modern neritomorph superfamilies to diverge from the others.

According to the taxonomy of the Gastropoda (Ponder & Lindberg, 1997) Neritopsina is a gastropod superorder in the subclass Orthogastropoda. The superfamily Palaeotrochoidea is contained within Neritopsina but its order placement is undetermined.

The taxonomy of the Gastropoda by Bouchet & Rocroi, 2005 categorizes Neritimorpha as a gastropod mollusk clade. It is one of the 6 highest clades in Gastropoda. It contains the clades Cyrtoneritimorpha, Cycloneritimorpha, as well as Paleozoic Neritimorpha of uncertain position.

Clades (and uncertain position taxa) in Neritimorpha include:

- † Paleozoic Neritimorpha of uncertain position
- † clade Cyrtoneritimorpha
- clade Cycloneritimorpha

Four extant superfamilies are recognised: Helicinoidea, Hydrocenoidea, Neritoidea and Neritopsoidea.

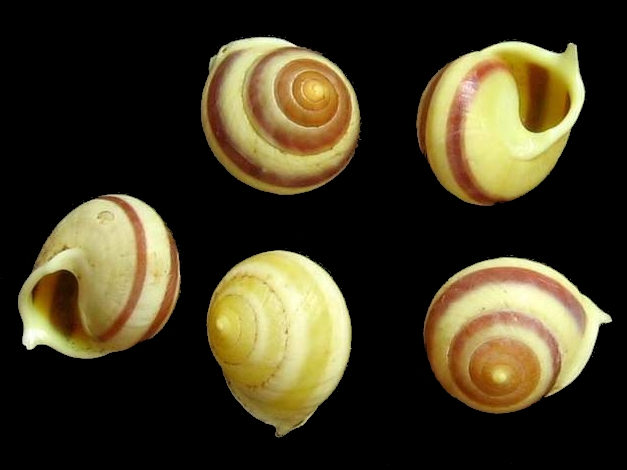
Various views of a shell of the land snail species Helicina rostrata
family Helicinidae

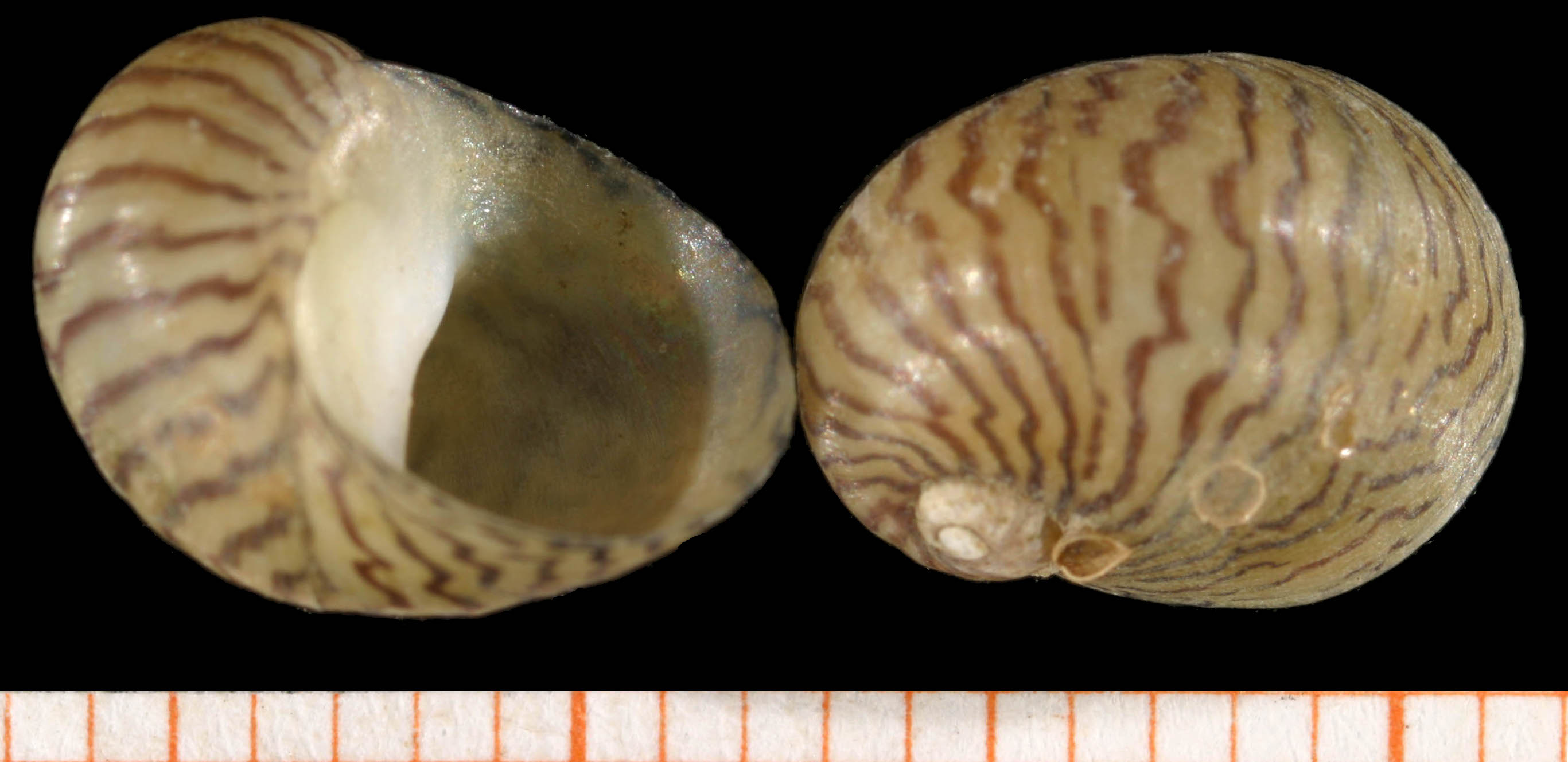
Two views of a shell of the freshwater snail Theodoxus danubialis
family Neritidae

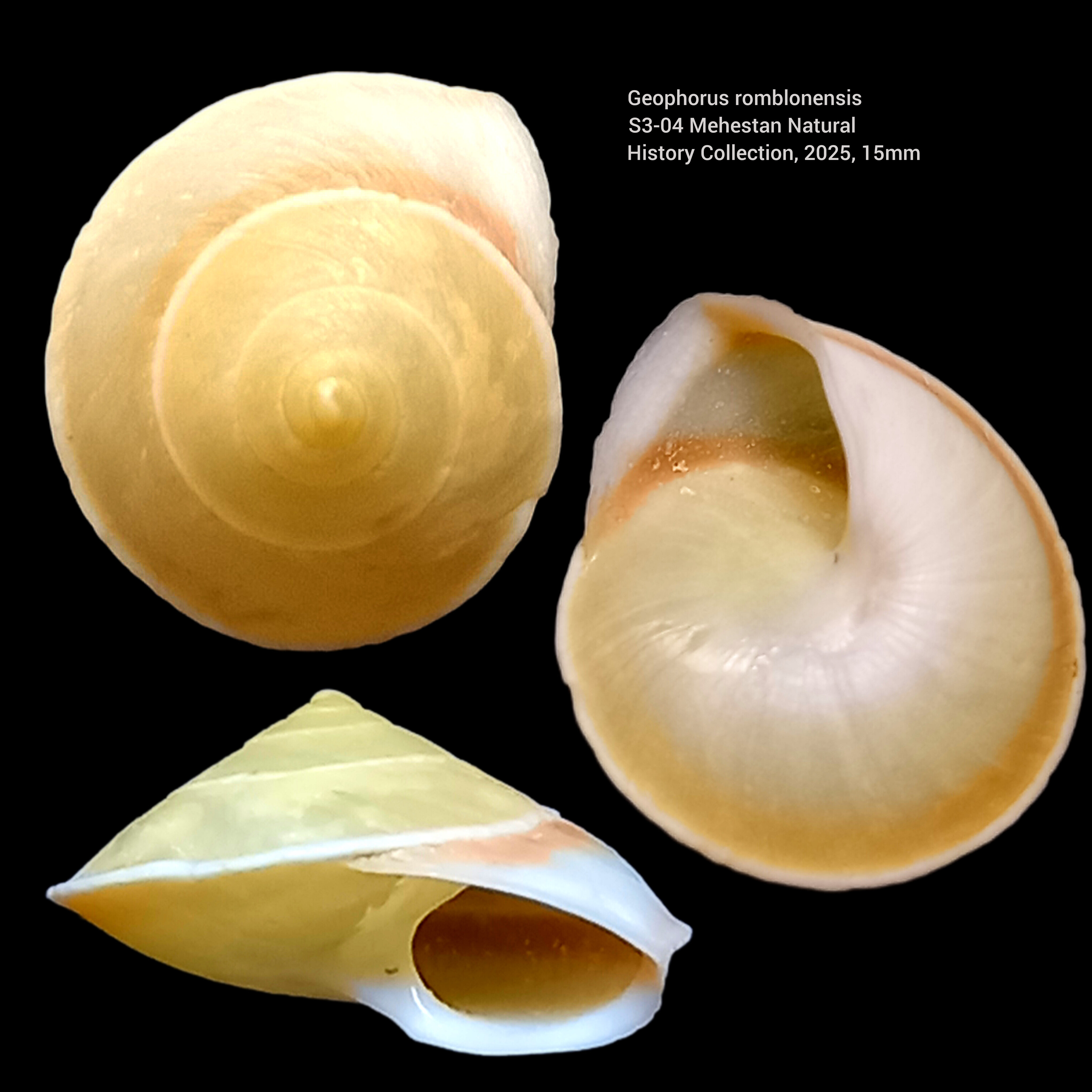
Three views of a shell of Geophorus romblonensis, family Helicinidae
