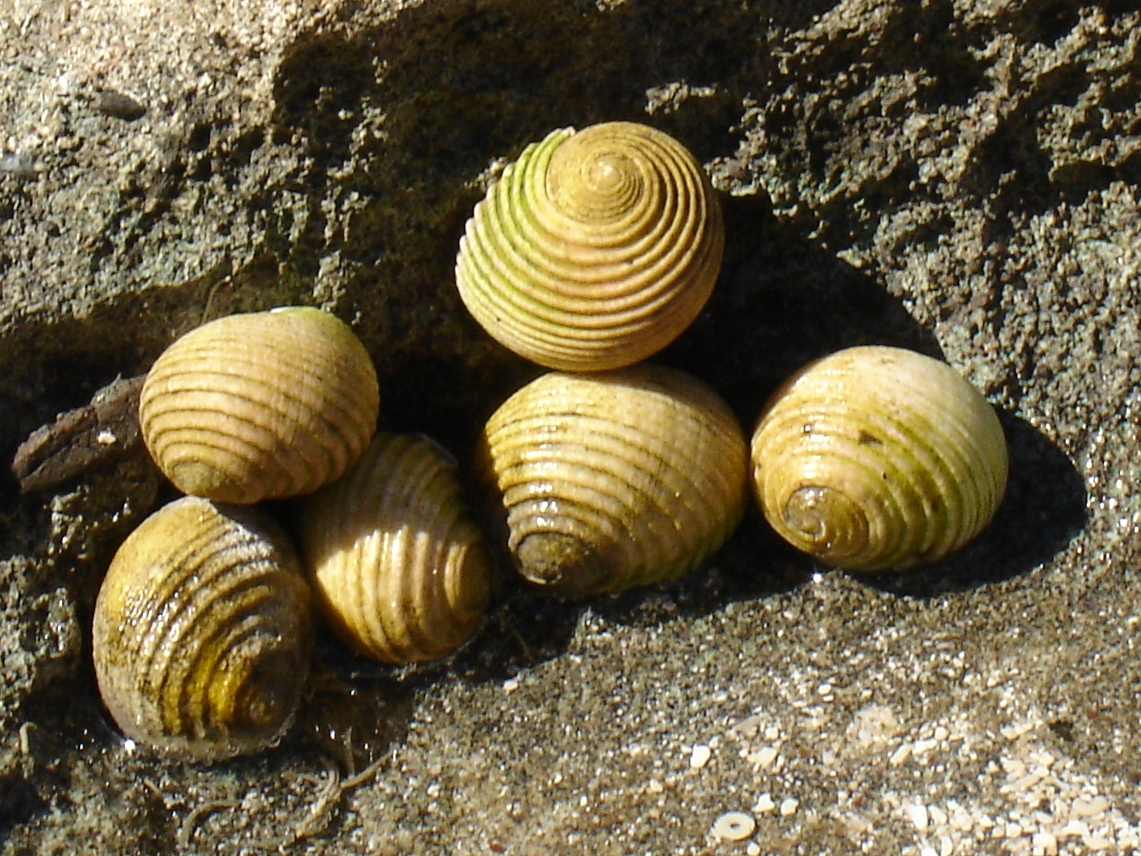
- Family Neritidae: Nerita plicata on intertidal rock surfaces at Turtle Island, Fiji

Scientific classification
- Kingdom: Animalia
- Phylum: Mollusca
- Class: Gastropoda
- Subclass: Neritimorpha
- Order: Cycloneritida

Superfamilies
- See text

Synonyms
- Cycloneritimorpha

= Cycloneritida =

Order of gastropods

Cycloneritida (nerites and false-limpets) is an order of land snails, freshwater snails, and sea snails.

These are gastropod molluscs within the subclass Neritimorpha. 14 of the families in the order are extant, and eight of the families are extinct.

It was previously categorized as the clade Cycloneritimorpha.

According to the Taxonomy of the Gastropoda (Bouchet & Rocroi, 2005), as well as the Cycloneritida, the subclass Neritimorpha also contains the (entirely fossil) clade Cyrtoneritimorpha, plus a number of other fossil families that are currently unassigned.

The earliest evolutionary forms of Cycloneritimorpha show double visceral organs, double gills, and normally a double-chambered heart.

== Taxonomy ==
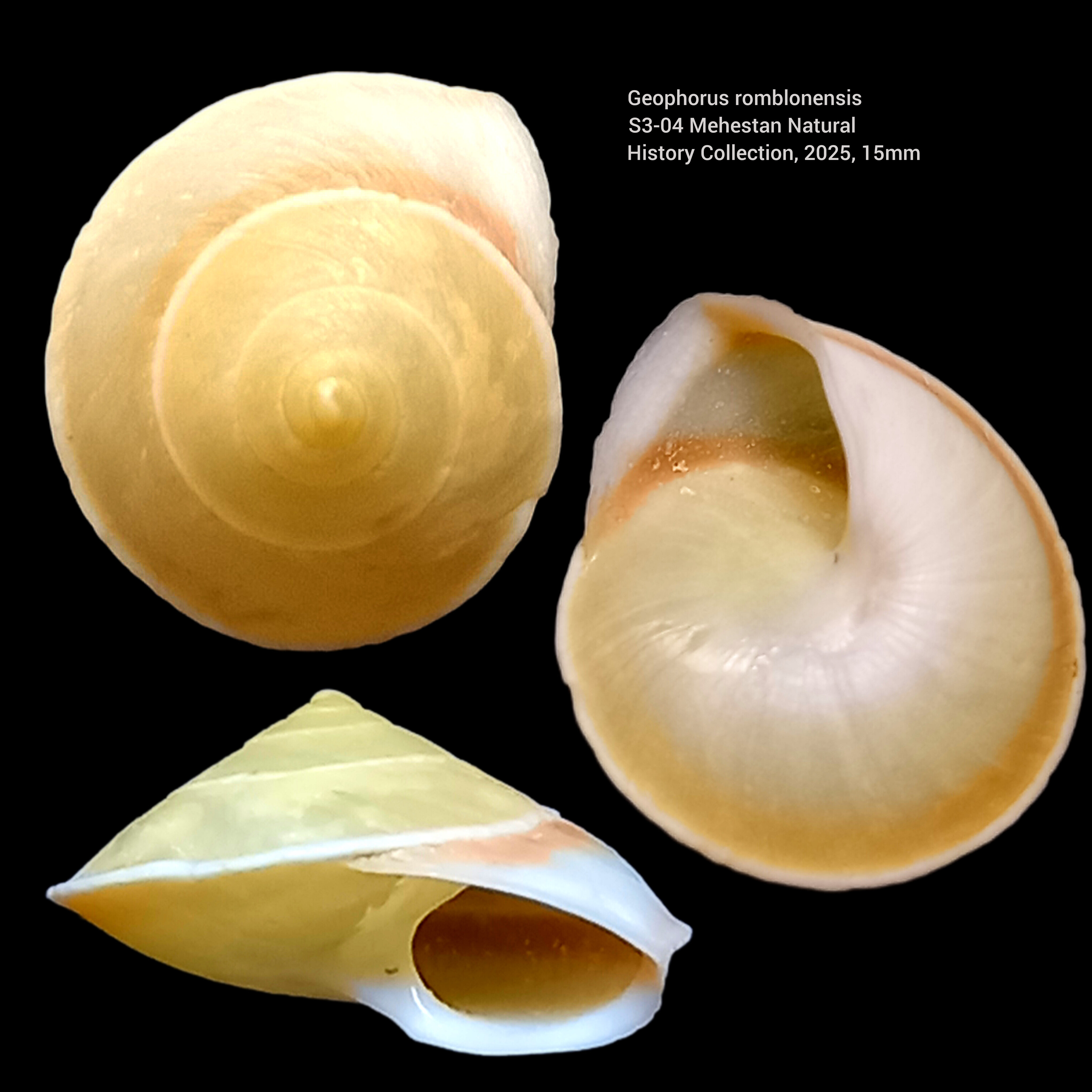
Geophorus romblonensis, family Helicinidae

The taxonomy of Cycloneritida is based on work by Kano et al. (2002) that recognizes four clades. These clades are established on genetic analysis (28S rRNA) of recent species only. These clades proposed by Kano are ranked as superfamilies in the taxonomy of the Gastropoda (Bouchet & Rocroi, 2005).

The spelling of Cycloneritimorpha has been amended to the order Cycloneritida in the new taxonomy of the Gastropoda by Bouchet and Rocroi in 2017.

Clade Cycloneritimorpha contains:

- Superfamily Helicinoidea
  - Family Helicinidae
  - † Family Dawsonellidae
  - † Family Deianiridae
  - Family Neritiliidae
  - Family Proserpinellidae
  - Family Proserpinidae
- Superfamily Hydrocenoidea
  - Family Hydrocenidae
- † Superfamily Naticopsoidea Waagen, 1880
- Superfamily Neritoidea
  - Family Neritidae
  - Family Phenacolepadidae
  - † Family Pileolidae
- Superfamily Neritopsoidea
  - Family Neritopsidae
  - † Family Cortinellidae
  - † Family Delphinulopsidae
  - † Family Plagiothyridae
  - † Family Pseudorthonychiidae
  - Family Titiscaniidae
- † Superfamily Symmetrocapuloidea
  - † Family Symmetrocapulidae
