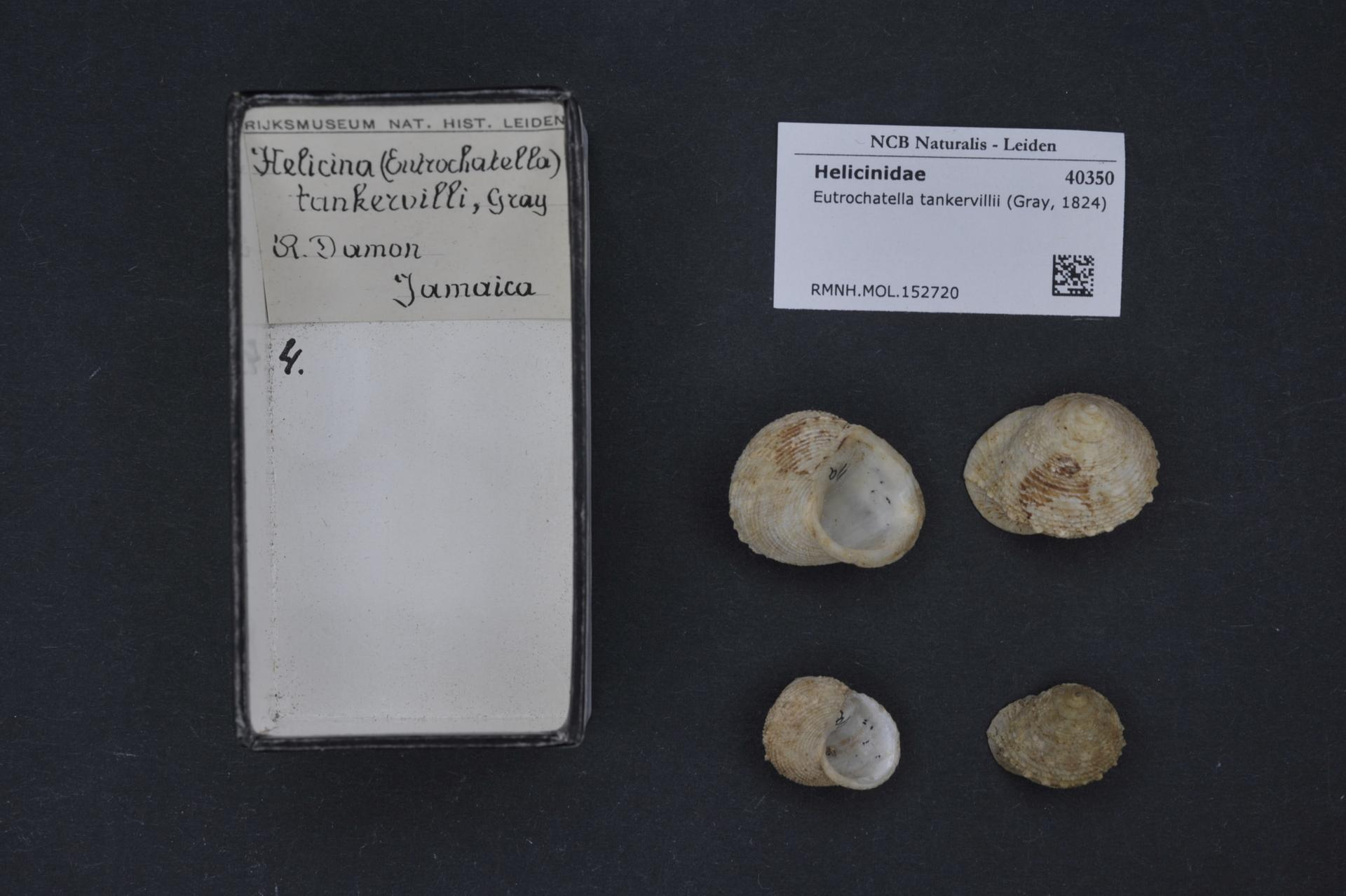
- Eutrochatella tankervillii shells.

Scientific classification
- Kingdom: Animalia
- Phylum: Mollusca
- Class: Gastropoda
- Order: Cycloneritida
- Family: Helicinidae
- Subfamily: Vianinae; H. B. Baker, 1922

= Vianinae =

Subfamily of gastropod

Vianinae is a subfamily of tropical land snail, a terrestrial gastropod mollusk in the family Helicinidae.

== Species ==
According to the World Register of Marine Species, the following genera are accepted within Vianinae:

- Calidviana H. B. Baker, 1954
- Calybium Morlet, 1892
- Eutrochatella P. Fischer, 1885
- Geophorus P. Fischer, 1885
- Geotrochatella P. Fischer, 1891
- Heudeia Crosse, 1885
- Lucidella Swainson, 1840
- Priotrochatella H. Fischer, 1893
- Pseudotrochatella G. Nevill, 1881
- Pyrgodomus Crosse &P. Fischer, 1894
- Semitrochatella Aguayo & Jaume, 1958
- Swiftella H. B. Baker, 1941
- Troschelviana H. B. Baker, 1922
- Ustronia A. J. Wagner, 1908
- Viana H. Adams & A. Adams, 1856
