= Terrestrial mollusc =

Ecological group

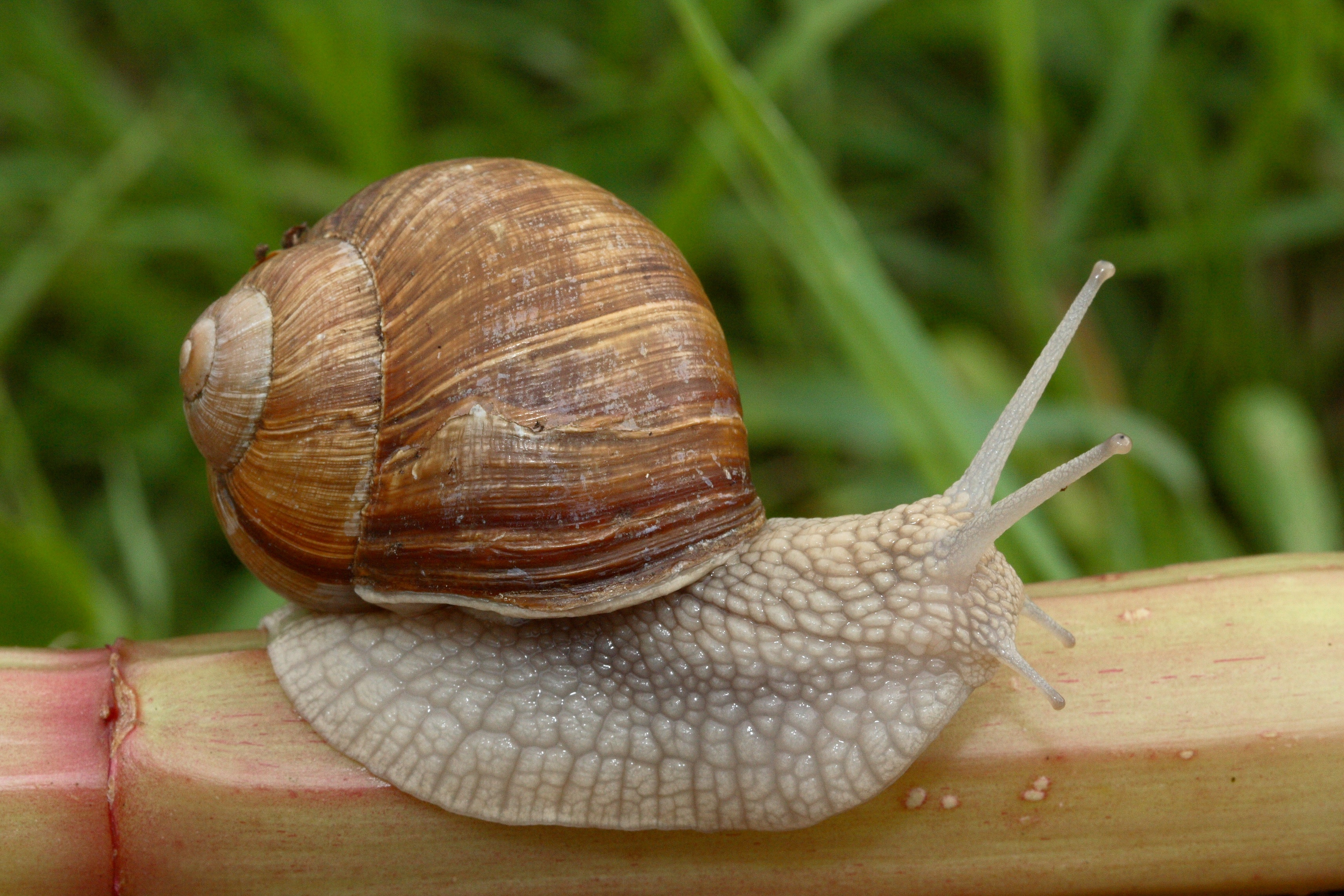
Land snail Helix pomatia

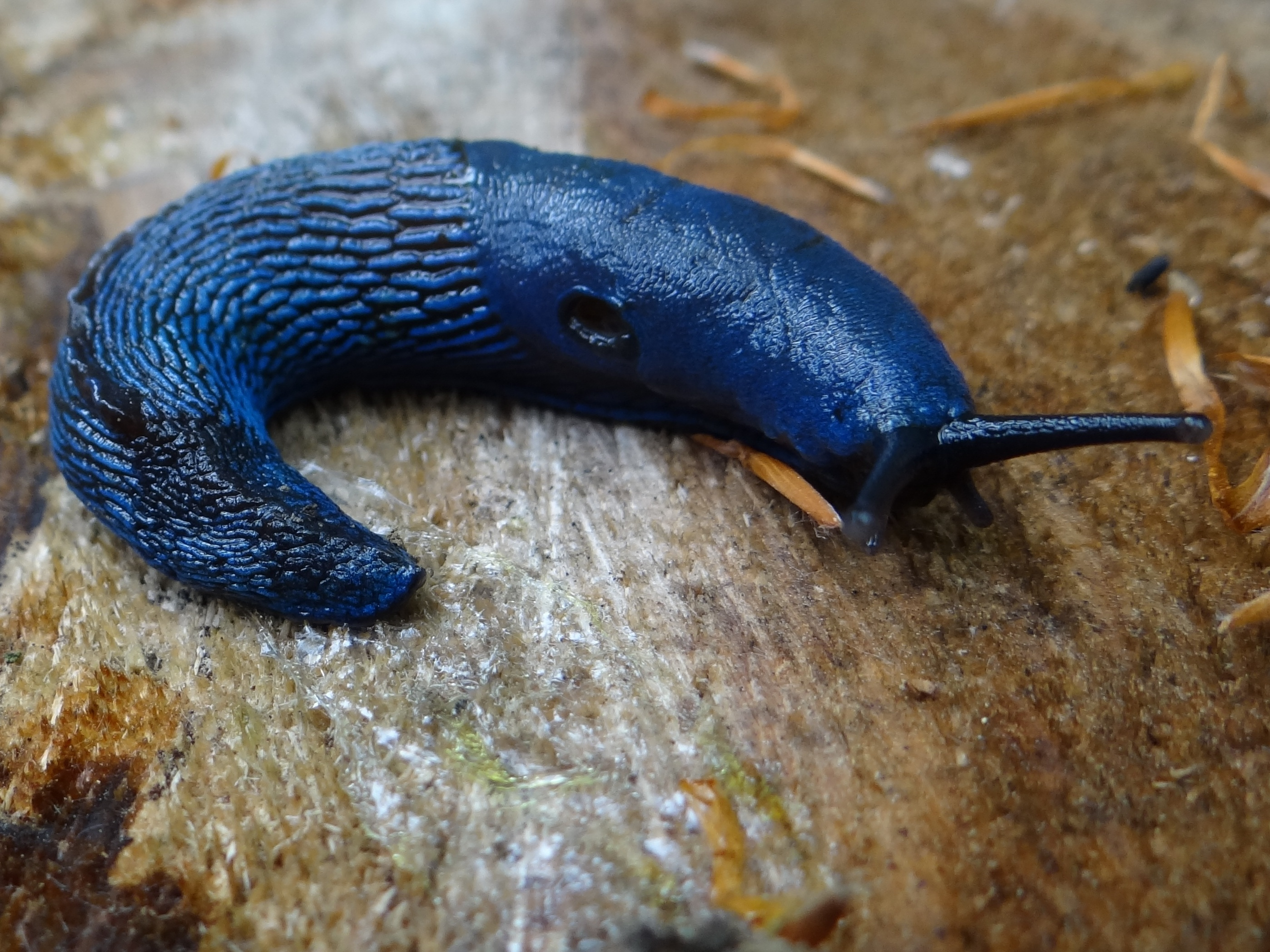
Land slug Bielzia coerulans

Terrestrial molluscs or land molluscs (mollusks) are an ecological group that includes all molluscs that live on land in contrast to freshwater and marine molluscs. They probably first occurred in the Carboniferous, arising from freshwater ones.

== Characteristics ==
This group includes land snails and land slugs. Loss of the shell has taken place many times in different groups that are not evolutionarily closely related, and land snails and slugs are most often treated together as a single group in specialized malacological literature.

All terrestrial molluscs belong to the class Gastropoda. However, colonization of the land took place several times during the evolutionary past, and as a result terrestrial molluscs are classified in several different, often not closely related, gastropod taxa.

Terrestrial mollusks comprise about 35 thousand species, most of which belong to the order (in some sources suborder or infraorder) Stylommatophora.

Terrestrial molluscs occur across most of the planet, with the exception of Antarctica and some islands. They inhabit a wide range of ecosystems, from deserts and tundras to rainforests.

In terms of survival, this group of species is currently one of the most threatened; there are more known species extinctions of terrestrial molluscs than in any other group of organisms.

== Taxonomic diversity ==
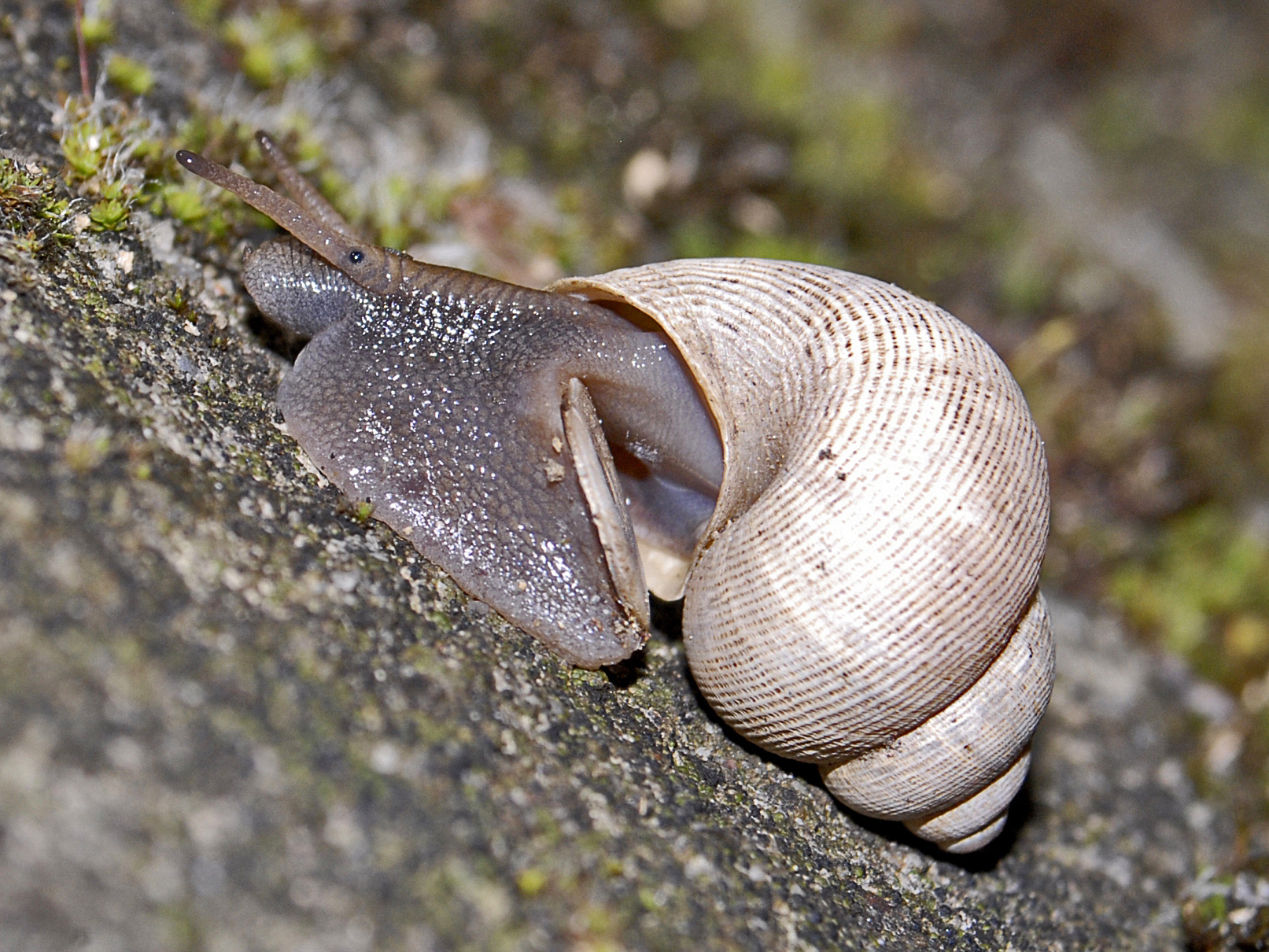
Operculate land snail Pomatias elegans

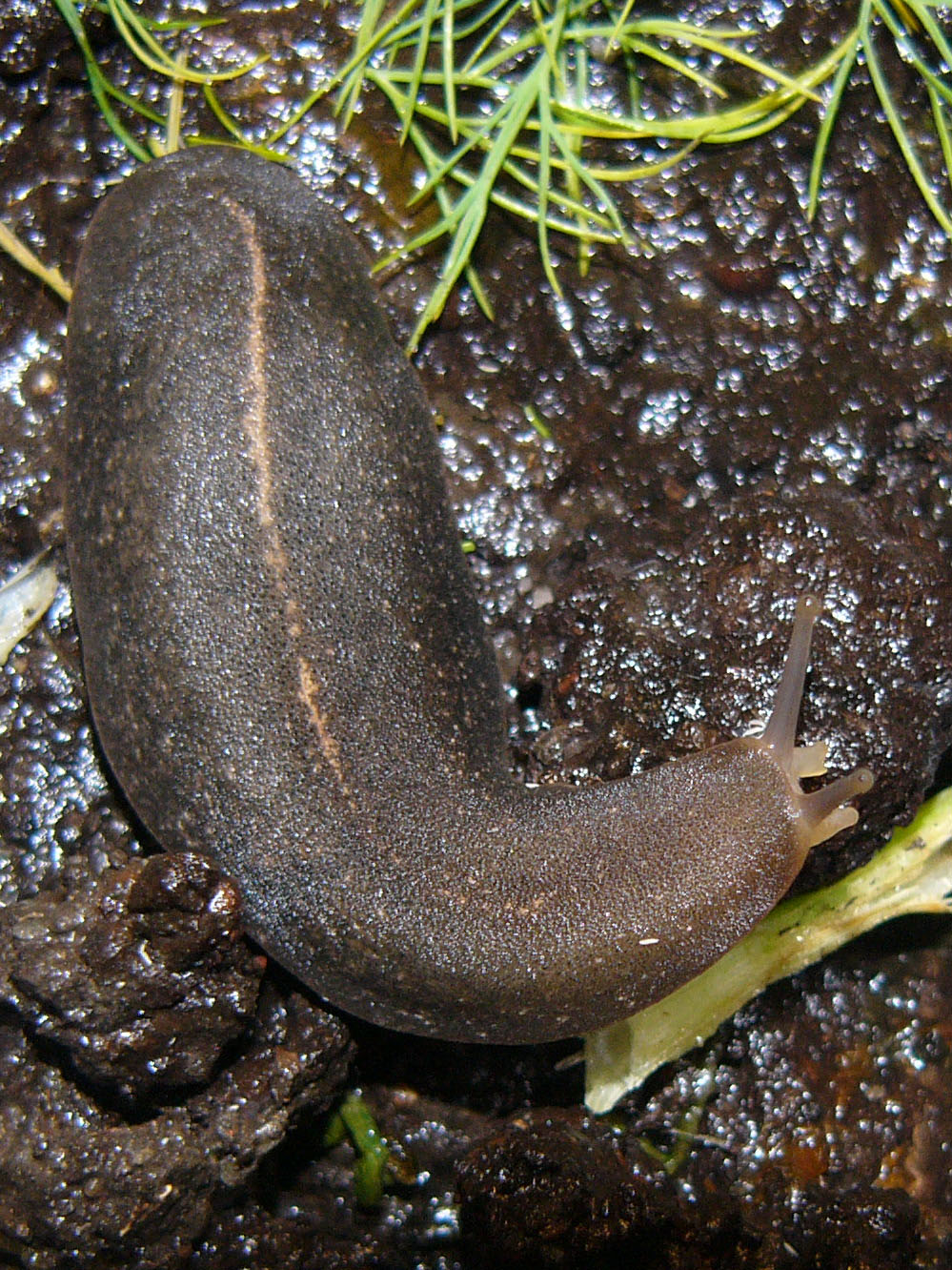
Land systellommatophoran slug Laevicaulis alte

According to an estimate from Cameron, of the 409 existing gastropod families, 119 include terrestrial molluscs. Among these 119 families, 104 are Stylommatophora, 7 are terrestrial pulmonates other than stylommatophorans, and 8 are operculates (formerly "prosobranchs", molluscs with an operculum, a group that primarily consists of marine snails).

"Prosobranchs"

- Cyclophoroidea (up to 10 families in different classifications)
- Helicinidae, Proserpinellidae and Proserpinidae (in the superfamily Helicinoidea)
- Pomatiidae (in the superfamily Littorinoidea, which consist mainly of marine snails)
- Assimineidae and Truncatellidae (in the superfamily Truncatelloidea, which consist mainly of aquatic snails; most species semi-marine)

"Pulmonates"

- Amphiboloidea (three families of land and semi-marine snails)
- Ellobioidea (Ellobiida) (1–5 families in different classifications, some of the species live in litoral both in marine and terrestrial habitats)
- Systellommatophora (3 families of land and semi-marine slugs)
- Stylommatophora (more than 100 families of land snails and slugs)

== Best known terrestrial malacologists ==
- Oskar Boettger
- Jacques Philippe Raymond Draparnaud
- Wilhelm Kobelt
- Henry Augustus Pilsbry
- Emil Adolf Rossmässler
- Heinrich Simroth
- Carl Agardh Westerlund

== See also ==
- Land snail
- Land slug
- Stylommatophora
- Freshwater mollusc
- Freshwater snail
- Sea snail

== Most important literature ==
- Barker G. M. (ed.) The biology of terrestrial molluscs. CABI Publishing, 2001, 558 pp. ISBN 0-85199-318-4.
- Cameron R. Slugs and snails. HarperCollins Publishers, London, 2016, 508 pp. ISBN 978-0-00-711301-9.
