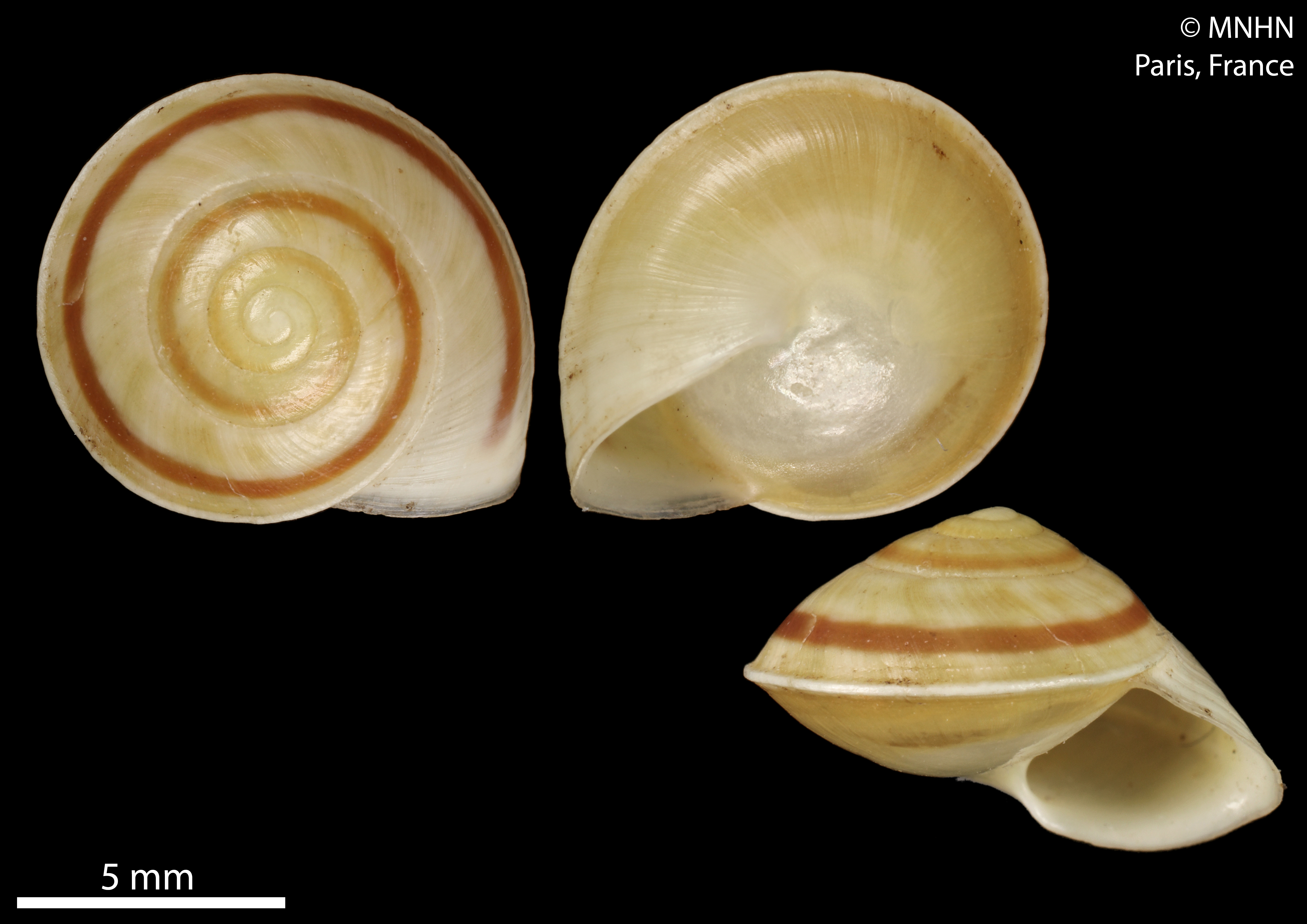
- Shell of Pleuropoma varians (specimen at MNHN, Paris)

Scientific classification
- Kingdom: Animalia
- Phylum: Mollusca
- Class: Gastropoda
- Order: Cycloneritida
- Superfamily: Helicinoidea
- Family: Helicinidae
- Genus: Pleuropoma; Möllendorff, 1893

Type species
- Helicina dichroa Möllendorff, 1890

Synonyms
- Helicina (Pleuropoma) Möllendorff, 1893 (original rank); Pleuropoma (Pleuropoma) Möllendorff, 1893

= Pleuropoma =

Genus of gastropods

Pleuropoma is a genus of land snails with an operculum. It is a genus of terrestrial gastropod mollusks in the subfamily Helicininae of the family Helicinidae.

== Characteristics ==
(Original description in Latin) The shell is small and features an obtuse keel. The peristome is slightly expanded and possesses an internal lip. The operculum is calcareous and is furnished on its interior surface with a transverse, slightly elevated lamella that is divided into two branches.

== Species ==
- Pleuropoma albescens (Hartman, 1890)
- Pleuropoma andamanica (Benson, 1860)
- Pleuropoma arakanensis (W. T. Blanford, 1865)
- Pleuropoma articulata (L. Pfeiffer, 1854)
- Pleuropoma brecanrio Stanisic, 2010
- Pleuropoma dichroa (Möllendorff, 1890)
- Pleuropoma draytonensis (Pfeiffer, 1857)
- Pleuropoma dunkeri (Zelebor, 1867)
- Pleuropoma extincta (Odhner, 1917)
- Pleuropoma falcistoma van Benthem Jutting, 1963
- Pleuropoma gilvum van Benthem Jutting, 1963
- Pleuropoma gladstonensis (Cox, 1864)
- Pleuropoma gouldiana (E. Forbes, 1852)
- Pleuropoma jana (Cox, 1872)
- Pleuropoma macleayi (Brazier, 1876)
- Pleuropoma mariae A. J. Wagner, 1911
- Pleuropoma nicobarica (L. Pfeiffer, 1847)
- Pleuropoma nonouensis Neal, 1934
- Pleuropoma pelewensis (Sykes, 1901)
- Pleuropoma queenslandica Stanisic, 2010
- Pleuropoma raiatensis (Garrett, 1884)
- Pleuropoma reflexilabiata Stanisic, 2010
- Pleuropoma richardson Stanisic, 2010
- Pleuropoma rogersi (Bourne, 1911)
- Pleuropoma rotella (G. B. Sowerby II, 1842)
- Pleuropoma scrupula (Benson, 1863)
- Pleuropoma simulans (Garrett, 1884)
- Pleuropoma sophiae (Brazier, 1876)
- Pleuropoma spatei Stanisic, 2010
- Pleuropoma sphaeridium (Möllendorff, 1896)
- Pleuropoma sphaeroconus (Möllendorff, 1895)
- Pleuropoma subrufa (Garrett, 1884)
- Pleuropoma taeniata (Quoy & Gaimard, 1832)
- Pleuropoma talusata Stanisic, 2010
- Pleuropoma varians (Sykes, 1903)
- Pleuropoma vicina A. J. Wagner, 1911
- Pleuropoma walkeri (E. A. Smith, 1894)

Synonyms

- Pleuropoma aruana (L. Pfeiffer, 1859): synonym of Aphanoconia aruana (L. Pfeiffer, 1859)
- Pleuropoma calamianica (Möllendorff, 1898): synonym of Aphanoconia trichroa calamianica (Möllendorff, 1898) (chresonym)
- Pleuropoma chichijimanum Kuroda, 1956: synonym of Ogasawarana chichijimana (Kuroda, 1956) (original combination)
- Pleuropoma laciniosa (Mighels, 1845): synonym of Sturanya laciniosa (Mighels, 1945)
- Pleuropoma maugeriae (Gray, 1824): synonym of Orobophana maugeriae (Gray, 1824) (new combination)
- Pleuropoma mediana (Gassies, 1870): synonym of Sturanya mediana (Gassies, 1870)
- Pleuropoma metamorpha Kuroda, 1956: synonym of Ogasawarana metamorpha (Kuroda, 1956) (original combination)
- Pleuropoma primeana (Gassies, 1863): synonym of Sturanya sphaeroidea (L. Pfeiffer, 1855) (synonym)
- Pleuropoma subsculpta Neal, 1934: synonym of Sturanya subsculpta (Neal, 1934) (new combination)
- Pleuropoma sublaevigata (L. Pfeiffer, 1852): synonym of Sturanya sublaevigata (L. Pfeiffer, 1852)
- Pleuropoma togatula (Morelet, 1857): synonym of Sturanya macgillivrayi (L. Pfeiffer, 1855) (junior synonym)
- Pleuropoma yorkensis (L. Pfeiffer, 1863) (uncertain > nomen dubium)
