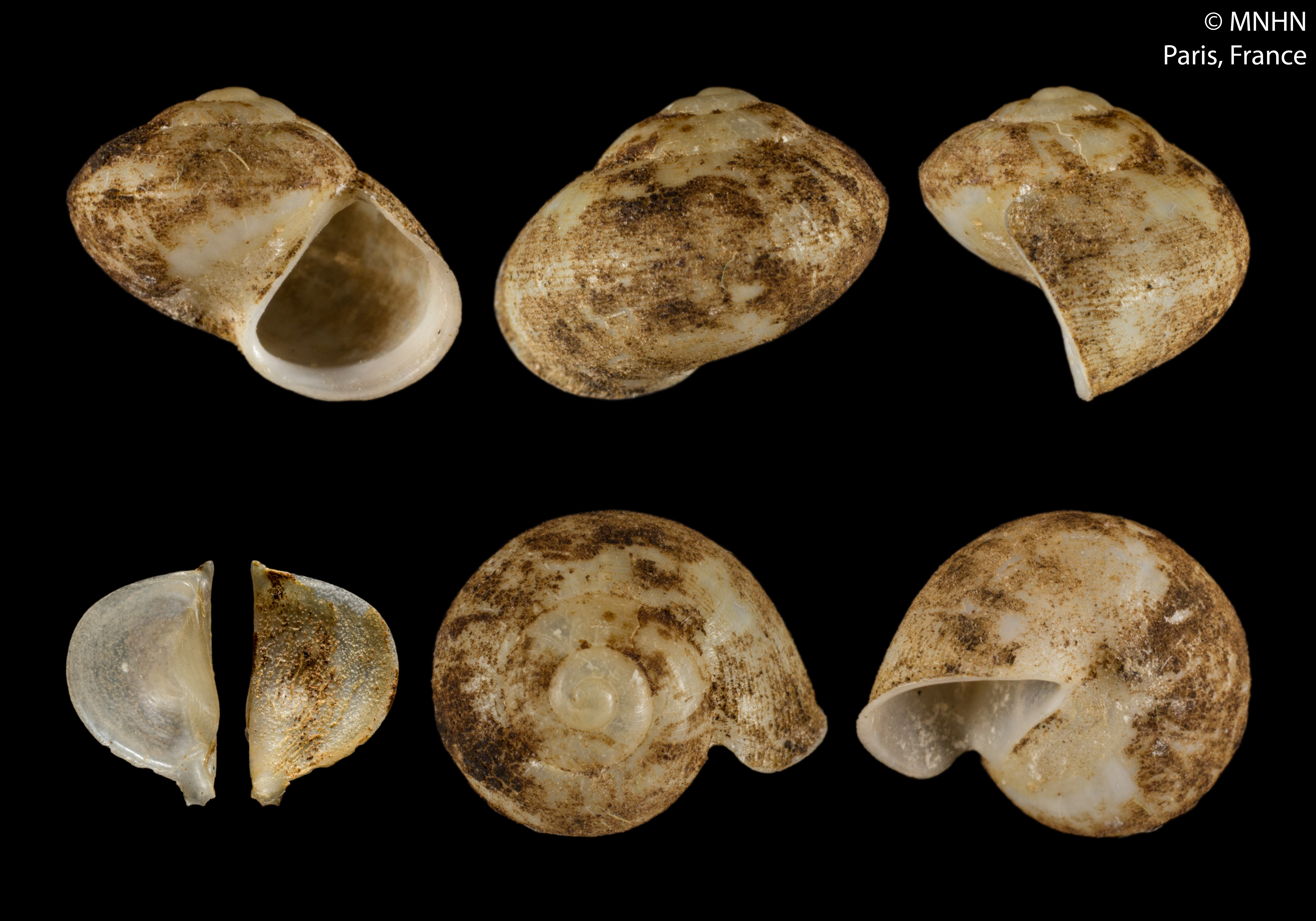
- Shell of Schasicheila pannucea (syntype at MNHN, Paris)

Scientific classification
- Kingdom: Animalia
- Phylum: Mollusca
- Class: Gastropoda
- Order: Cycloneritida
- Superfamily: Helicinoidea
- Family: Helicinidae
- Genus: Schasicheila; Shuttleworth, 1852

Synonyms
- Schasicheila (Atoyac) H. B. Baker, 1928 · alternate representation; Schasicheila (Misantla) H. B. Baker, 1928 · alternate representation; Schasicheila (Necaxa) H. B. Baker, 1928 · alternate representation; Schasicheila (Schasicheila) Shuttleworth, 1852 · alternate representation; Schazichiela [sic] (misspelling)

= Schasicheila =

Genus of gastropods

Schasicheila is a genus of land snails with an operculum. It is a genus of terrestrial gastropod mollusks in the subfamily Helicininae of the family Helicinidae.

== Species ==
- Schasicheila alata (L. Pfeiffer, 1849)
- Schasicheila fragilis Pilsbry, 1899
- Schasicheila hidalgoana Dall, 1897
- Schasicheila hinkleyi Pilsbry, 1920
- Schasicheila minuscula (L. Pfeiffer, 1859)
- Schasicheila misantlensis P. Fischer & Crosse, 1893
- Schasicheila nicoleti Shuttleworth, 1852
- Schasicheila palmeri Dall, 1905
- Schasicheila pannucea (Morelet, 1849)
- Schasicheila vanattai Pilsbry, 1899
- Schasicheila walkeri Hinkley, 1920
- Schasicheila xanthia Pilsbry, 1909

Synonyms

- Schasicheila bahamensis L. Pfeiffer, 1862: synonym of Alcadia bahamensis (L. Pfeiffer, 1862) (unaccepted > superseded combination, basionym)
- Schasicheila pilsbryi A. J. Wagner, 1911: synonym of Schasicheila misantlensis P. Fischer & Crosse, 1893
