= Negopenia =

Scientific classification
- Kingdom: Animalia
- Phylum: Mollusca
- Class: Gastropoda
- Order: Cycloneritida
- Superfamily: Helicinoidea
- Family: Helicinidae
- Genus: Negopenia; Iredale, 1941

Type species
- Negopenia leucostoma idesa Iredale, 1941

Genus of gastropods

Negopenia is a monotypic genus of tropical land snails with an operculum. It is a genus of terrestrial gastropod mollusks in the subfamily Helicininae of the family Helicinidae.

== Species ==
- Negopenia leucostoma (Tapparone Canefri, 1883)
