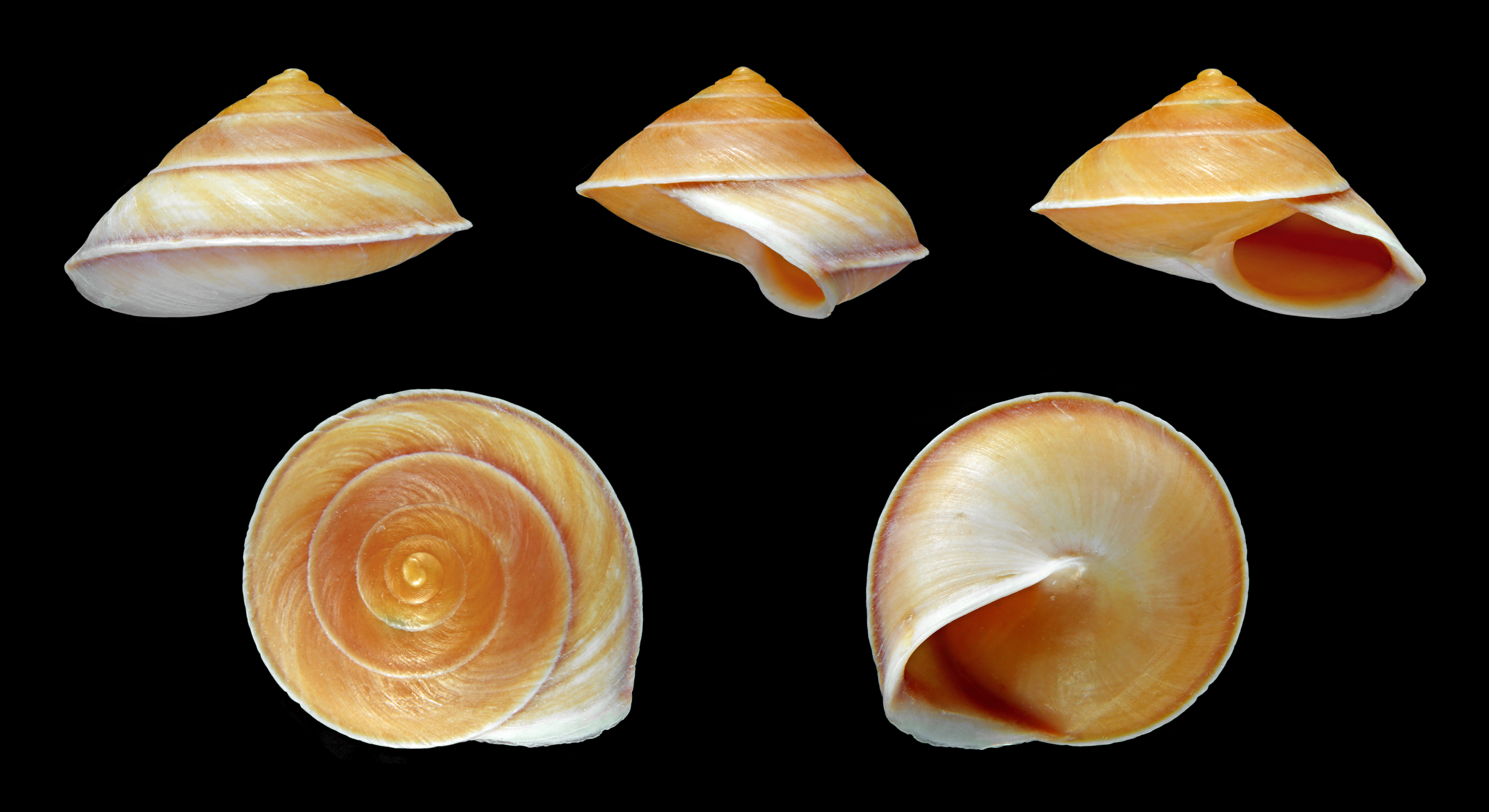
- Five views of a shell of Geophorus agglutinans

Scientific classification
- Kingdom: Animalia
- Phylum: Mollusca
- Class: Gastropoda
- Order: Cycloneritida
- Family: Helicinidae
- Genus: Geophorus
- Species: G. agglutinans

Binomial name
- Geophorus agglutinans (G. B. Sowerby II, 1842)

= Geophorus agglutinans =

Species of gastropod

Geophorus agglutinans is a species of tropical land snail with an operculum, a terrestrial gastropod mollusks in the family Helicinidae.
