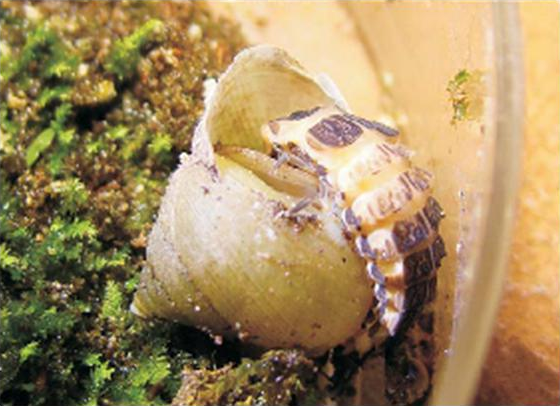
- firefly larva Alecton discoidalis is feeding on Ustronia sloanei keeping the operculum at side, in captivity

Scientific classification
- Kingdom: Animalia
- Phylum: Mollusca
- Class: Gastropoda
- Order: Cycloneritida
- Family: Helicinidae
- Genus: Ustronia
- Species: U. sloanei

Binomial name
- Ustronia sloanei (d’Orbigny, 1842)

= Ustronia sloanei =

Species of gastropod

Ustronia sloanei is a species of an operculate land snail, terrestrial gastropod mollusk in the family Helicinidae.

== Distribution ==
This species lives in Cuba.

== Ecology ==
Ustronia sloanei is a rock dwelling species.

Predators of Ustronia sloanei include larvae of firefly bug Alecton discoidalis.
