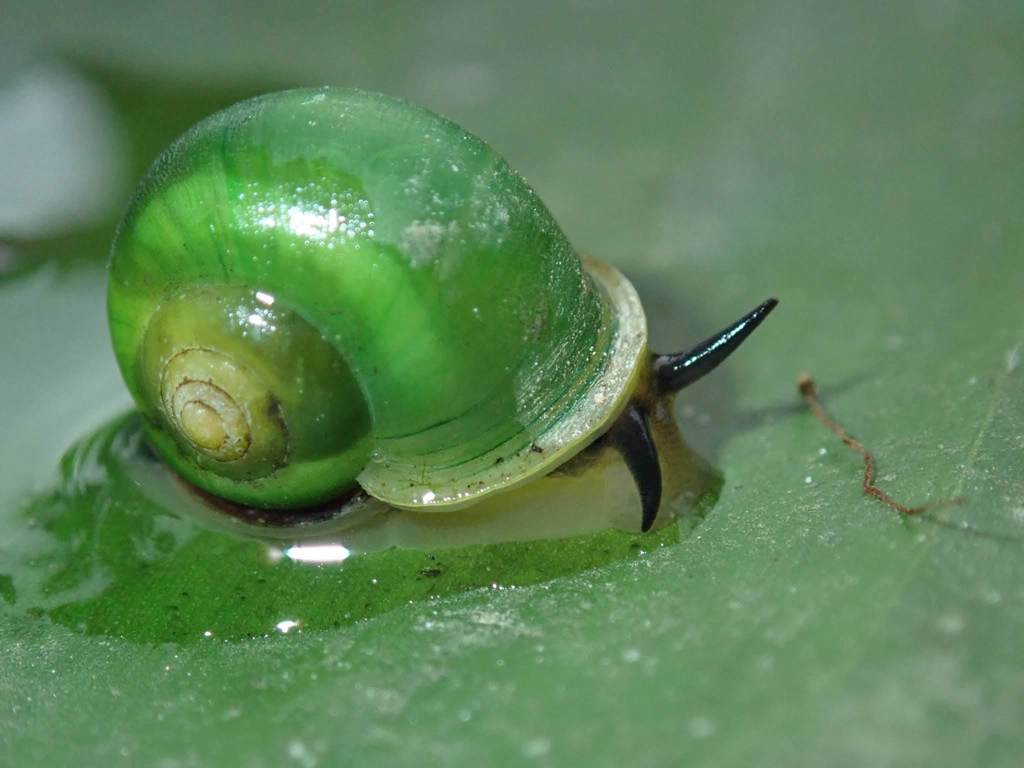
- Bourciera sp., from Pichincha, Ecuador

Scientific classification
- Domain: Eukaryota
- Kingdom: Animalia
- Phylum: Mollusca
- Class: Gastropoda
- Subclass: Neritimorpha
- Order: Cycloneritida
- Superfamily: Helicinoidea
- Family: Helicinidae
- Genus: Bourciera; Pfeiffer, 1852

Type species
- Cyclostoma heliciniforme L. Pfeiffer, 1853

Synonyms
- Pseudhelicina Sykes, 1907 (unnecessary replacement name of Bourciera L. Pfeiffer, 1852)

= Bourciera =

Genus of gastropods

Bourciera is a genus of neotropical terrestrial gastropod mollusks or land snails in the family Helicinidae. All species in the genus have an operculum.

In 1907, an attempt was made to rename the genus Pseudhelicina, sometimes corrected to Pseudohelicina, on the basis of the fact that Bourciera was also the name of a genus of birds, but according to MolluscaBase this replacement was unnecessary and Bourciera is still used. H. Burrington Baker considered Bourciera among the most primitive of terrestrial mollusks.

== Distribution ==
The genus was initially described from Ecuador based on specimens collected by Jules Bourcier, after whom it was named. It is also known to occur in Peru.

== Species ==
Species within the genus Bourciera include:

- Bourciera fraseri Pfeiffer 1859
- Bourciera helicinaeformis Pfeiffer 1853
- Bourciera striatula Miller 1879
- Bourciera viridissima Miller 1879
