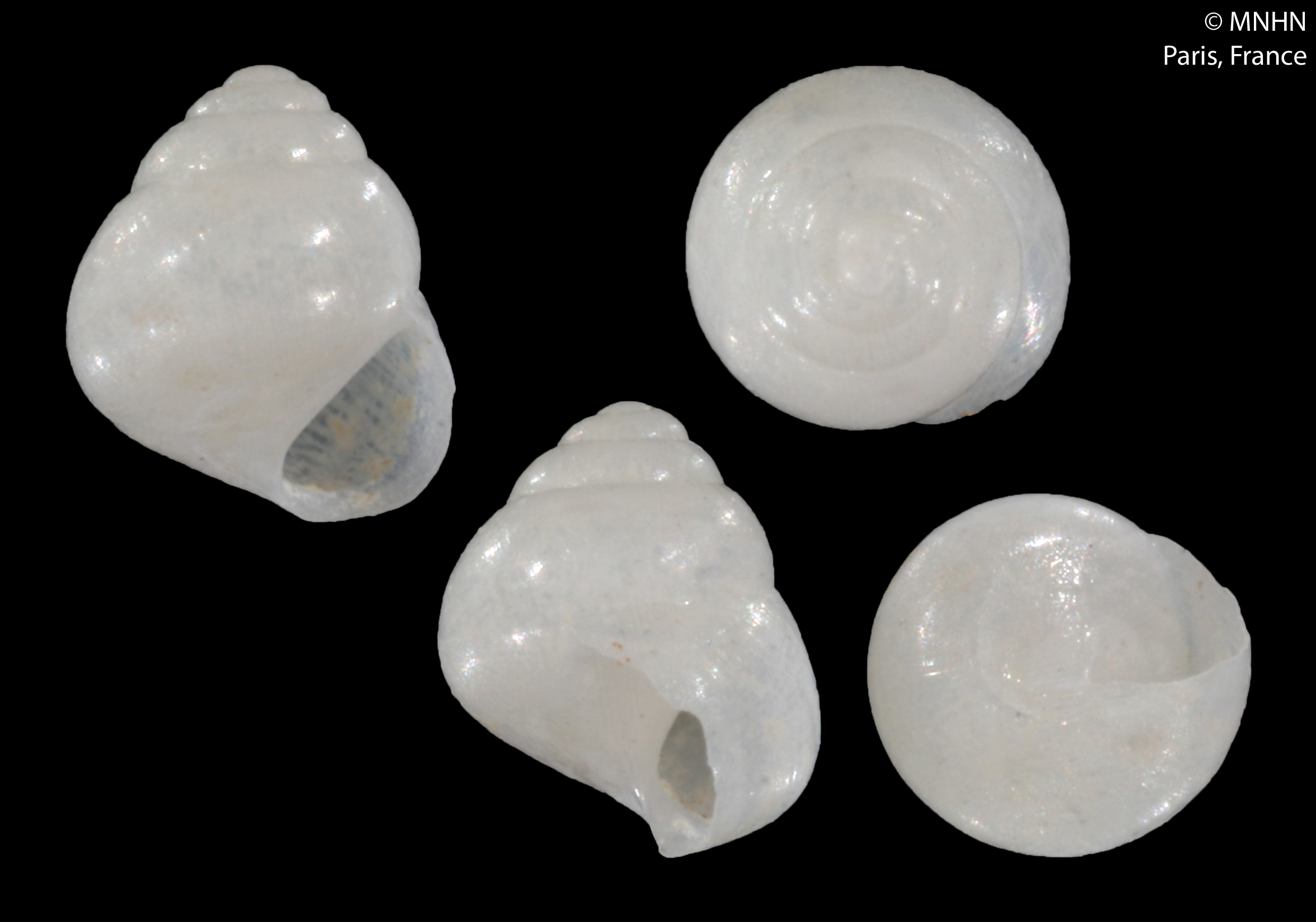
- Shell of Nesiocina abdoui (holotype at MNHN, Paris)

Scientific classification
- Kingdom: Animalia
- Phylum: Mollusca
- Class: Gastropoda
- Order: Cycloneritida
- Superfamily: Helicinoidea
- Family: Helicinidae
- Genus: Nesiocina; Richling & Bouchet, 2013

Type species
- Helicina discoidea Pease, 1868

Synonyms
- Discoidea A. J. Wagner, 1905 (invalid: junior homonym of Discoidea Agassiz, 1834 [Echinodermata]; Nesiocina is a replacement name)

= Nesiocina =

Genus of gastropods

Nesiocina is a genus of tropical land snails with an operculum. It is a genus of terrestrial gastropod mollusks in the subfamily Helicininae of the family Helicinidae.

== Species ==
- Nesiocina abdoui Richling & Bouchet, 2013
- Nesiocina discoidea (Pease, 1868)
- Nesiocina gambierensis Richling & Bouchet, 2013
- Nesiocina grohi Richling & Bouchet, 2013
- Nesiocina mangarevae Richling & Bouchet, 2013
- Nesiocina parvula (Pease, 1868)
- Nesiocina pauciplicata Richling & Bouchet, 2013
- Nesiocina pazi (Crosse, 1865)
- Nesiocina solidula (G. B. Sowerby I, 1839)
- Nesiocina superoperculata Richling & Bouchet, 2013
- Nesiocina trilamellata Richling & Bouchet, 2013
- Nesiocina unilamellata Richling & Bouchet, 2013
- Nesiocina villosa (Anton, 1838)
