= Sturanyella epicharis =

Conservation status
- Data Deficient (IUCN 2.3)

Scientific classification
- Kingdom: Animalia
- Phylum: Mollusca
- Class: Gastropoda
- Order: Cycloneritida
- Family: Helicinidae
- Genus: Sturanyella
- Species: S. epicharis

Binomial name
- Sturanyella epicharis A. J. Wagner, 1907

Species of gastropod

Sturanyella epicharis is a species of land snail with an operculum, a terrestrial gastropod mollusk in the family Helicinidae, the helicinids.

== Distribution ==
This species is endemic to Micronesia.
