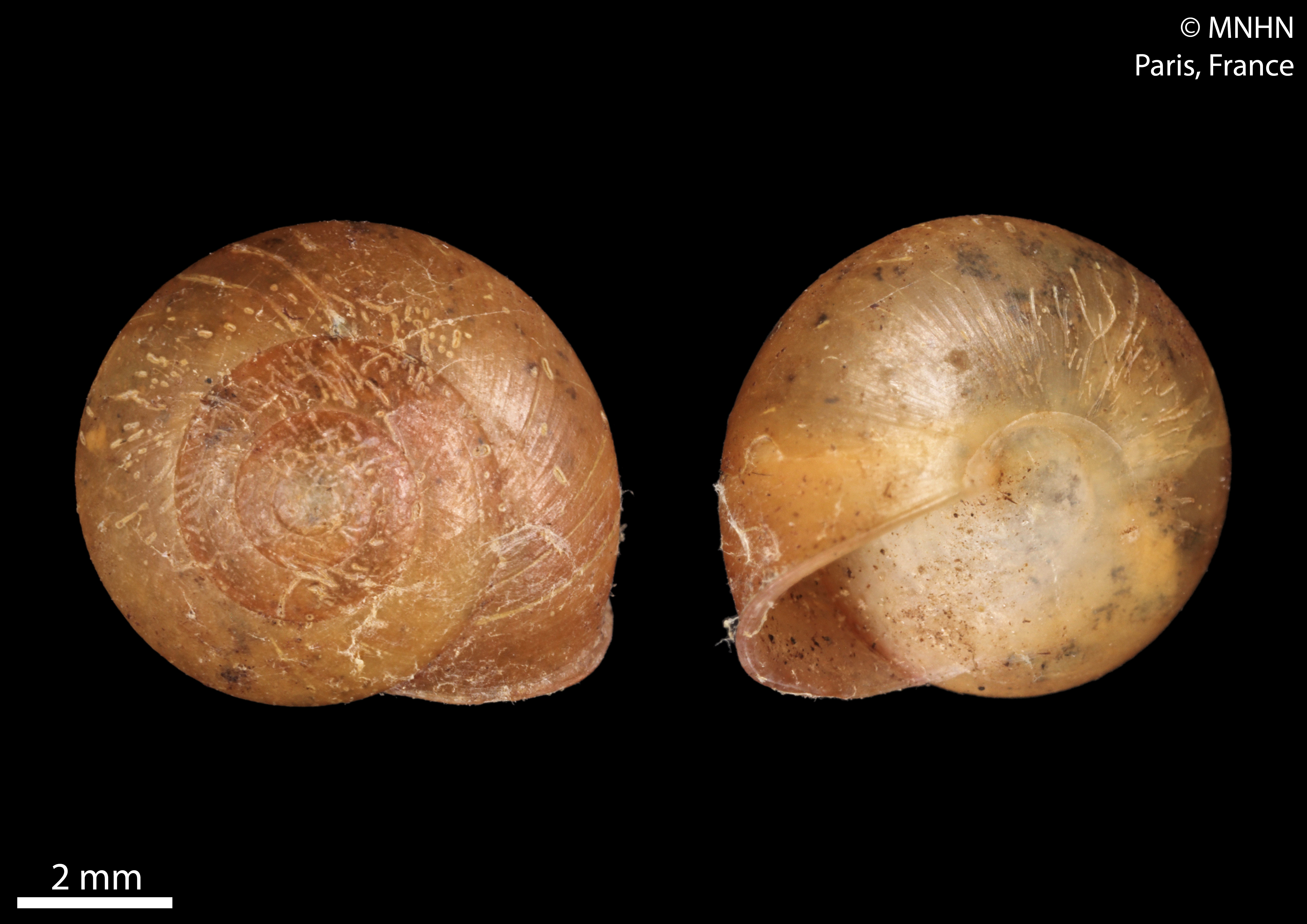
- Shell of Sturanya modesta (specimen at MNHN, Paris)

Scientific classification
- Kingdom: Animalia
- Phylum: Mollusca
- Class: Gastropoda
- Order: Cycloneritida
- Superfamily: Helicinoidea
- Family: Helicinidae
- Genus: Sturanya; A. J. Wagner, 1905

Type species
- Helicina plicatilis Mousson, 1865

Synonyms
- Sturanyella Pilsbry & C. M. Cooke, 1934 (objective junior synonym (same type species)

= Sturanya =

Genus of gastropods

Sturanya is a genus of land snails with an operculum. It is a genus of terrestrial gastropod mollusks in the subfamily Helicininae of the family Helicinidae.

== Species ==
- Sturanya alrici (Crosse, 1888)
- Sturanya baldwini (Ancey, 1904)
- Sturanya benigna (Crosse, 1870)
- Sturanya beryllina (A. Gould, 1847)
- Sturanya carolinarum (Möllendorff, 1900)
- Sturanya dautzenbergi (A. J. Wagner, 1909)
- Sturanya delta (Pilsbry & C. M. Cooke, 1908)
- Sturanya epicharis A. J. Wagner, 1907
- Sturanya eutrochatelloides Richling, 2009
- † Sturanya exanima (Neal, 1934)
- Sturanya gallina (Gassies, 1870)
- Sturanya gassiesiana (Crosse, 1874)
- Sturanya interna (Mousson, 1870)
- Sturanya jetschini A. J. Wagner, 1905
- † Sturanya juddii (Pilsbry & C. M. Cooke, 1908)
- Sturanya julii (Baird, 1873)
- Sturanya kauaiensis (Pilsbry & C. M. Cooke, 1908)
- Sturanya koumacensis Richling, 2009
- Sturanya laciniosa (Mighels, 1945)
- Sturanya laeta (Crosse, 1870)
- Sturanya littoralis (Montrouzier, 1859)
- Sturanya macgillivrayi (L. Pfeiffer, 1855)
- Sturanya magdalenae (Ancey, 1890)
- Sturanya makaroaensis Richling & Bouchet, 2013
- Sturanya matutina (Neal, 1934)
- Sturanya mediana (Gassies, 1870)
- Sturanya modesta (L. Pfeiffer, 1854)
- Sturanya mouensis (Crosse, 1870)
- Sturanya multicolor (A. Gould, 1847)
- Sturanya noumeensis (Crosse, 1874)
- Sturanya oahuensis (Pilsbry & C. M. Cooke, 1908)
- Sturanya plicatilis (Mousson, 1865)
- Sturanya porphyrostoma (Crosse, 1870)
- Sturanya rossiteri (Crosse, 1895)
- Sturanya rotelloidea (Mighels, 1845)
- Sturanya rubiginosa A. J. Wagner, 1907
- Sturanya sandwichiensis (Souleyet, 1852)
- Sturanya singularis A. J. Wagner, 1907
- Sturanya sola (Neal, 1934)
- Sturanya sphaeroidea (L. Pfeiffer, 1855)
- † Sturanya stokesii (Neal, 1934)
- Sturanya sublaevigata (L. Pfeiffer, 1852)
- Sturanya sublaevigatoides Richling, 2009
- Sturanya subsculpta (Neal, 1934)
- Sturanya tectiformis (Mousson, 1870)

Synonyms

- Sturanya novaecaledoniae (Baird, 1873): synonym of Sturanya mediana (Gassies, 1870)
- Sturanya parvula (Pease, 1868): synonym of Nesiocina parvula (Pease, 1868) (superseded combination)
- Sturanya uberta (A. A. Gould, 1847): synonym of Orobophana uberta (A. Gould, 1847) (unaccepted combination)
