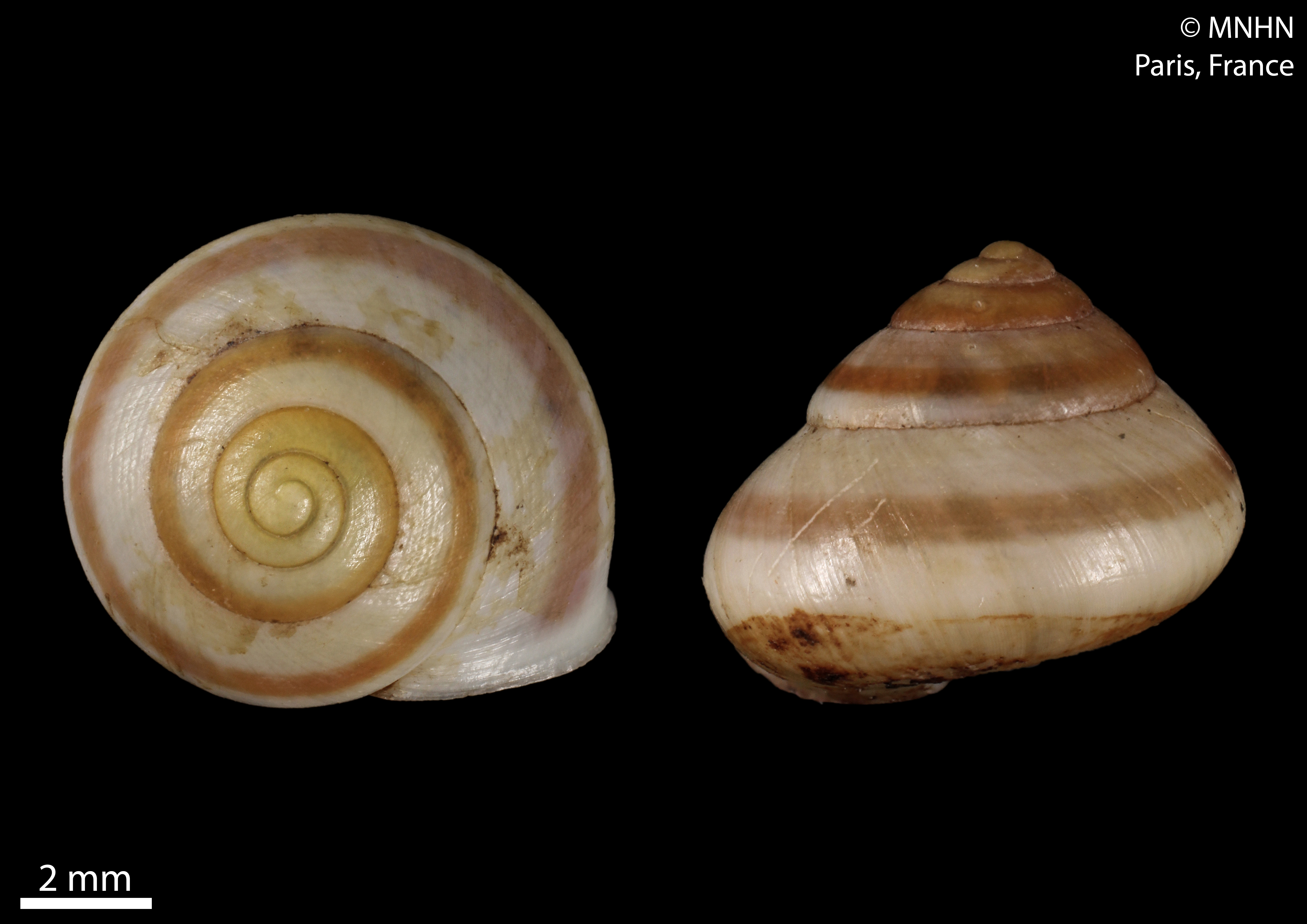
- Shell of Palaeohelicina egregia (specimen at MNHN, Paris)

Scientific classification
- Kingdom: Animalia
- Phylum: Mollusca
- Class: Gastropoda
- Order: Cycloneritida
- Superfamily: Helicinoidea
- Family: Helicinidae
- Genus: Palaeohelicina; A. J. Wagner, 1905

Type species
- Helicina fischeriana Montrouzier, 1863

Synonyms
- Helicina (Palaeohelicina) A. J. Wagner, 1905 (unaccepted rank); Kalokonia A. J. Wagner, 1909; Rhabdokonia A. J. Wagner, 1905 (junior synonym)

= Palaeohelicina =

Genus of gastropods

Nesiocina is a genus of land snails with an operculum. It is a genus of terrestrial gastropod mollusks in the subfamily Helicininae of the family Helicinidae.

== Species ==
- Palaeohelicina congener (E. A. Smith, 1889)
- Palaeohelicina egregia (L. Pfeiffer, 1855)
- Palaeohelicina filiae A. J. Wagner, 1905
- Palaeohelicina fischeriana (Montrouzier, 1863)
- Palaeohelicina heterochroa A. J. Wagner, 1905
- Palaeohelicina insularum (Hedley, 1891)
- Palaeohelicina livida (Hombron & Jacquinot, 1848)
- Palaeohelicina louisiadensis (Forbes, 1851)
- Palaeohelicina mayri Clench, 1958
- Palaeohelicina novoguineensis (E. A. Smith, 1887)
- Palaeohelicina novopommerana I. Rensch, 1937
- Palaeohelicina rabei (Pilsbry, 1897)
- Palaeohelicina spinifera (L. Pfeiffer, 1855)
- Palaeohelicina stanleyi (Forbes, 1851)
- Palaeohelicina viperina I. Rensch & B. Rensch, 1935
- Palaeohelicina vocator Iredale, 1941
- Palaeohelicina woodlarkensis (E. A. Smith, 1891)

Species brought into synonymy

- Palaeohelicina moquiniana (Récluz, 1851): synonym of Palaeohelicina livida (Hombron & Jacquinot, 1848) (junior synonym)
