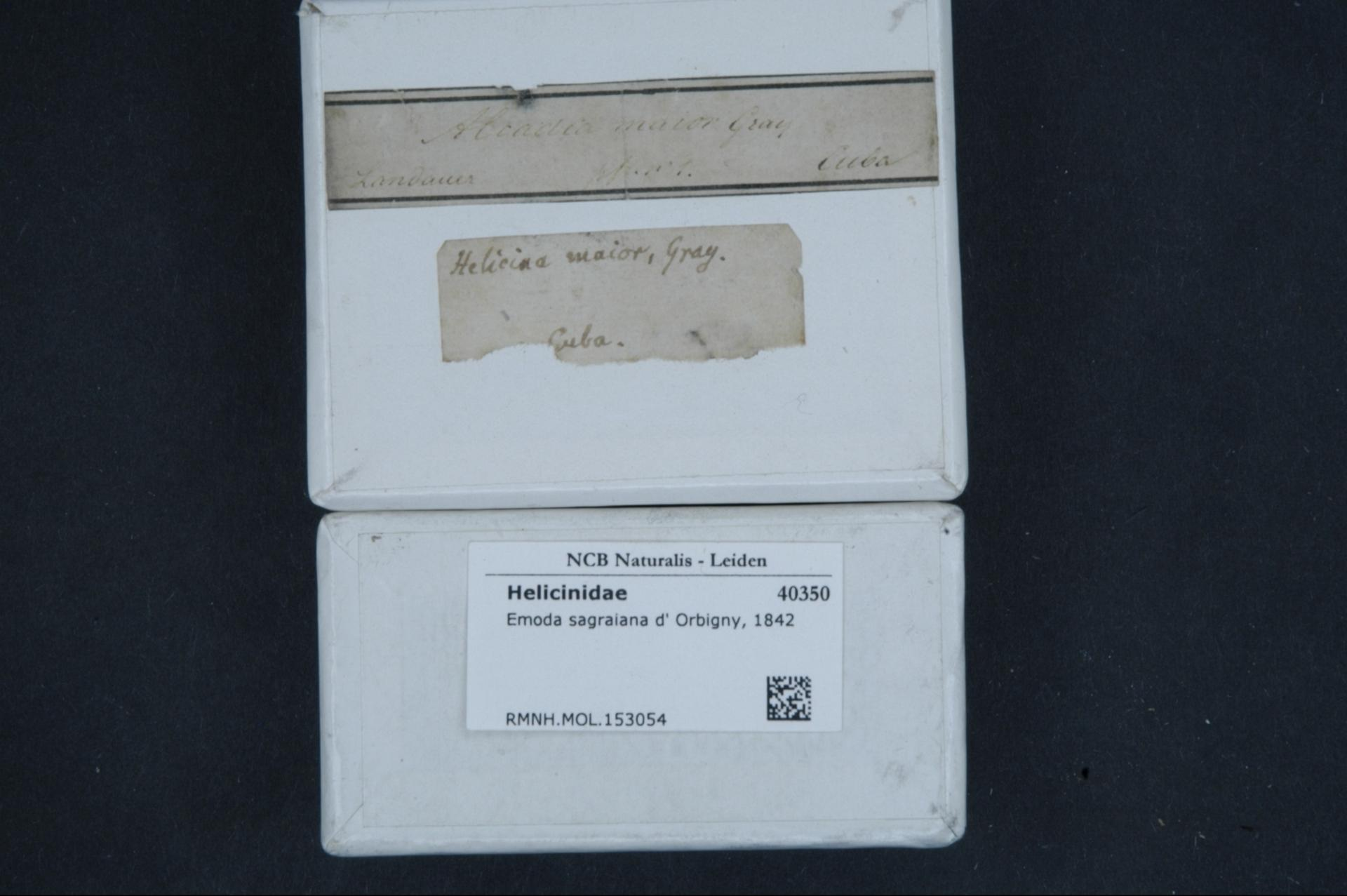

Scientific classification
- Kingdom: Animalia
- Phylum: Mollusca
- Class: Gastropoda
- Order: Cycloneritida
- Family: Helicinidae
- Genus: Emoda
- Species: E. sagraiana

Binomial name
- Emoda sagraiana (d’Orbigny, 1842)

Synonyms
- Emoda sagraina [orth. error]

= Emoda sagraiana =

Species of gastropod

Emoda sagraiana is a species of an operculate land snail, terrestrial gastropod mollusk in the family Helicinidae.

== Distribution ==
This species lives in Cuba.

== Ecology ==
Emoda sagraiana is a ground dwelling species.

Predators of Emoda sagraiana include larvae of firefly bug Alecton discoidalis.
