= Semitrochatella conica =

Scientific classification
- Kingdom: Animalia
- Phylum: Mollusca
- Class: Gastropoda
- Order: Cycloneritida
- Family: Helicinidae
- Genus: Semitrochatella
- Species: S. conica

Binomial name
- Semitrochatella conica (Pfeiffer, 1839)

Species of gastropod

Semitrochatella conica is a species of the genus Semitrochatella, land snails with an operculum, terrestrial gastropod mollusks in the family Helicinidae.

Synonyms include Helicina conica Pfeiffer 1839, Trochatella conica Pfeiffer. Sowerby 1847, Helicina elegans Orbigny 1842, Helicina elongata Pfeiffer 1852, Trochatella conica Pfeiffer 1850, Eutrochatella (Artecallosa) conica Pfeiffer. Wagner 1908, Semitrochatella conica anafensis Aguayo & Jaume 1954.
