= Ceratodiscus =

Scientific classification
- Domain: Eukaryota
- Kingdom: Animalia
- Phylum: Mollusca
- Class: Gastropoda
- Subclass: Neritimorpha
- Order: Cycloneritida
- Family: Helicinidae
- Genus: Ceratodiscus; Simpson & Henderson, 1901

Genus of gastropods

Ceratodiscus is a genus of tropical and subtropical land snails with an operculum, terrestrial gastropod mollusks in the family Helicinidae.

Ceratodiscus is the type genus of the subfamily Ceratodiscinae.

== Species ==
Species within the genus Ceratodiscus include:

- Ceratodiscus minimus (Gundlach in Pfeiffer, 1859)
