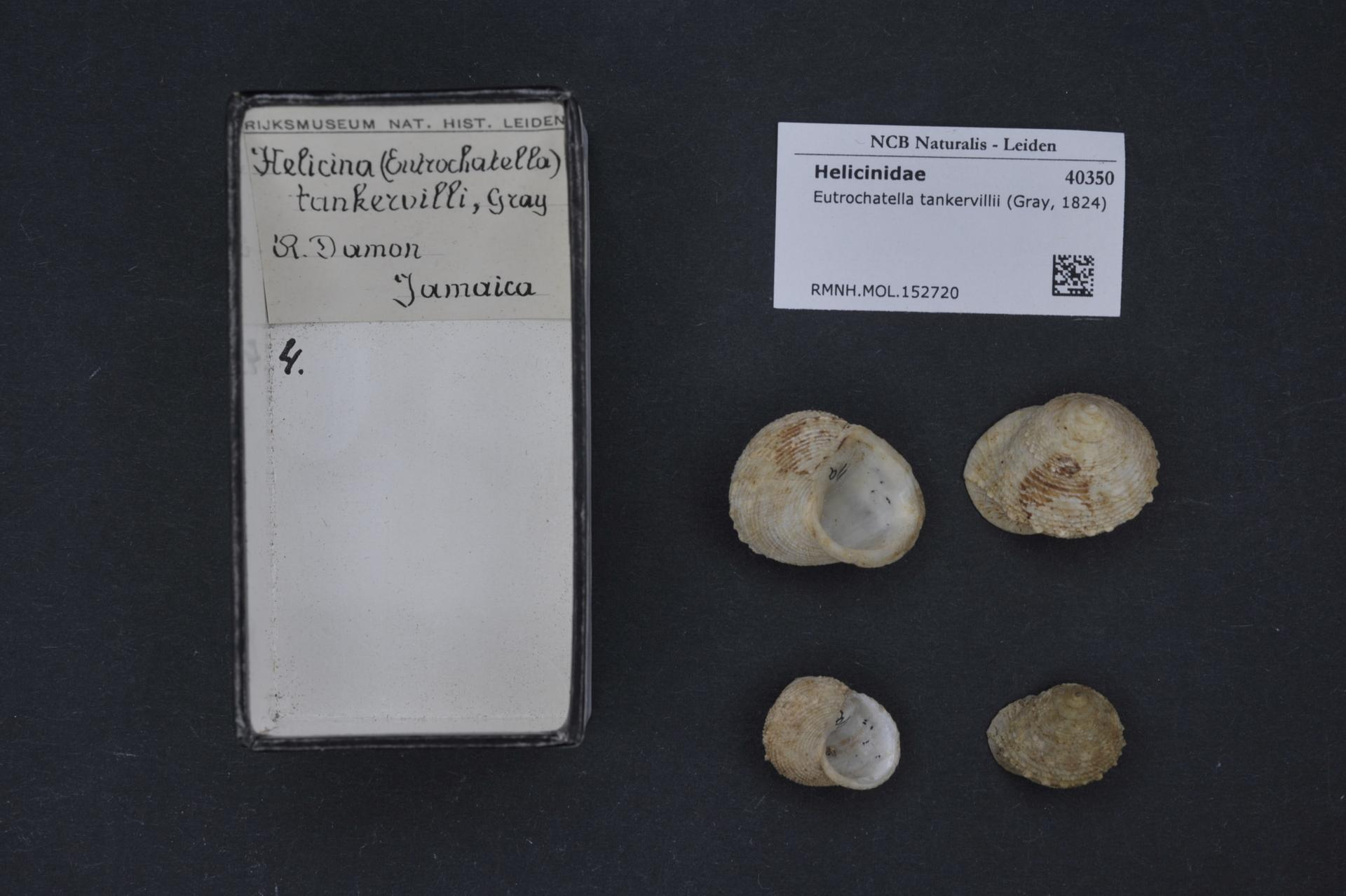
- Eutrochatella tankervillii shells.

Scientific classification
- Kingdom: Animalia
- Phylum: Mollusca
- Class: Gastropoda
- Order: Cycloneritida
- Family: Helicinidae
- Subfamily: Vianinae
- Genus: Eutrochatella; P. Fischer, 1885

Synonyms
- Eutrochatella (Eutrochatella) P. Fischer, 1885; Eutrochatella (Excavata) A. J. Wagner, 1907

= Eutrochatella =

Genus of gastropod

Eutrochatella is a genus of tropical land snail, a terrestrial gastropod mollusk in the family Helicinidae.

== Species ==
According to the World Register of Marine Species, the following species are accepted within Eutrochatella:

- Eutrochatella acklinsensis Clench, 1963
- Eutrochatella beatensis Bartsch, 1932
- Eutrochatella blandii (Weinland, 1880)
- Eutrochatella browniana (Weinland, 1880)
- Eutrochatella bryanti (L. Pfeiffer, 1867)
- Eutrochatella calida (Weinland, 1862)
- Eutrochatella candida (L. Pfeiffer, 1858)
- Eutrochatella chittyana (L. Pfeiffer, 1858)
- Eutrochatella circumlineata (Tryon, 1866)
- Eutrochatella costata (Gray, 1824)
- Eutrochatella eugeniana (Weinland, 1862)
- Eutrochatella globosa (G. B. Sowerby I, 1839)
- Eutrochatella klinei Clench, 1959
- Eutrochatella nobilis (C. B. Adams, 1851)
- Eutrochatella opima (Shuttleworth, 1852)
- Eutrochatella pulchella (Gray, 1824)
- Eutrochatella remota (Poey, 1858)
- Eutrochatella tankervillii (Gray, 1824)
- Eutrochatella virginea (I. Lea, 1832)
