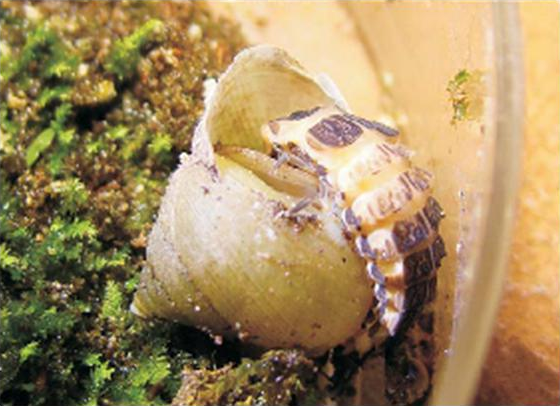
- firefly larva Alecton discoidalis is feeding on Ustronia sloanei keeping the operculum at side, in captivity

Scientific classification
- Kingdom: Animalia
- Phylum: Mollusca
- Class: Gastropoda
- Order: Cycloneritida
- Family: Helicinidae
- Genus: Ustronia; Kobelt, 1908

Synonyms
- Eutrochatella (Ustronia) A. J. Wagner, 1908 superseded combination (basionym)

= Ustronia =

Genus of gastropods

Ustronia is a genus of land snails with an operculum, terrestrial gastropod mollusks in the subfamily Vianinae of the family Helicinidae.

== Description ==
(Original description in German) The shell exhibits a broadly to acutely conical shape, comprising 5-9 whorls that gradually increase in size. The delicate sculpture typically consists of fine radial growth lines, although indistinct spiral threads may occasionally be present.

The aperture margin is thin and sharp, with the upper margin projecting and straight. The outer margin is expanded and recurved, while the basal margin narrows rapidly towards the insertion, forming a shallow bulge at the transition to the rounded columella. The basal callus is glossy and often brightly colored, displaying a more pronounced thickening around the columella, but remains relatively narrow overall.

The operculum is roughly trapezoidal, characterized by an angularly curved, convex spiral margin. The sigma margin is distinctly raised, exhibiting an angular break only at the nucleus, otherwise remaining nearly straight. Other characteristics conform to those typical of the genus.

== Distribution ==
Species in this genus are known to occur in Cuba.

== Species ==
Species within the genus Ustronia include:

- Ustronia acuminata (Velazquez in Poey, 1852)
- Ustronia sloanei (d’Orbigny, 1842)

Synonyms

- Ustronia sloanei [sic] Ustronia sloanii (A. d'Orbigny, 1842) (misspelling - incorrect subsequent spelling)
- Ustronia straminea (Morelet, 1851): synonym of Troschelviana pyramidalis (G. B. Sowerby II, 1842) (junior subjective synonym)
- Ustronia wrighti (L. Pfeiffer, 1863): synonym of Troschelviana rubromarginata (Gundlach, 1856) (junior subjective synonym)
