= Proserpina (gastropod) =

Scientific classification
- Kingdom: Animalia
- Phylum: Mollusca
- Class: Gastropoda
- Order: Cycloneritida
- Family: Proserpinidae
- Genus: Prosperina; G. B. Sowerby II, 1839

Type species
- Proserpina nitida G. B. Sowerby II, 1839

Synonyms
- Despoena Newton, 1891 (junior objective synonym); Odontostoma d'Orbigny, 1842; Proserpina (Despoenella) H.B. Baker, 1923· accepted, alternate representation; Proserpina (Proserpina) G.B. Sowerby II, 1839· accepted, alternate representation

Genus of gastropods

Proserpina is a genus of small land snails, terrestrial gastropod mollusks in the family Proserpinidae.

Proserpina is the type genus of the family Proserpinidae.

== Distribution ==
Distribution of the genus Proserpina include Cuba and Jamaica .

== Species ==
Species within the genus Proserpina include:

- Proserpina bidentata C. B. Adams, 1850
- Proserpina depressa (d’Orbigny, 1842)
- Proserpina globulosa (d’Orbigny, 1842)
- Proserpina infortunata
- Proserpina linguifera (Jonas, 1839)
- † Proserpina milleri (Fulton, 1915)
- Proserpina nitida Sowerby II, 1839
- Proserpina pisum C. B. Adams, 1850
- Proserpina planior
- Proserpina scudderae Thompson, 1980
