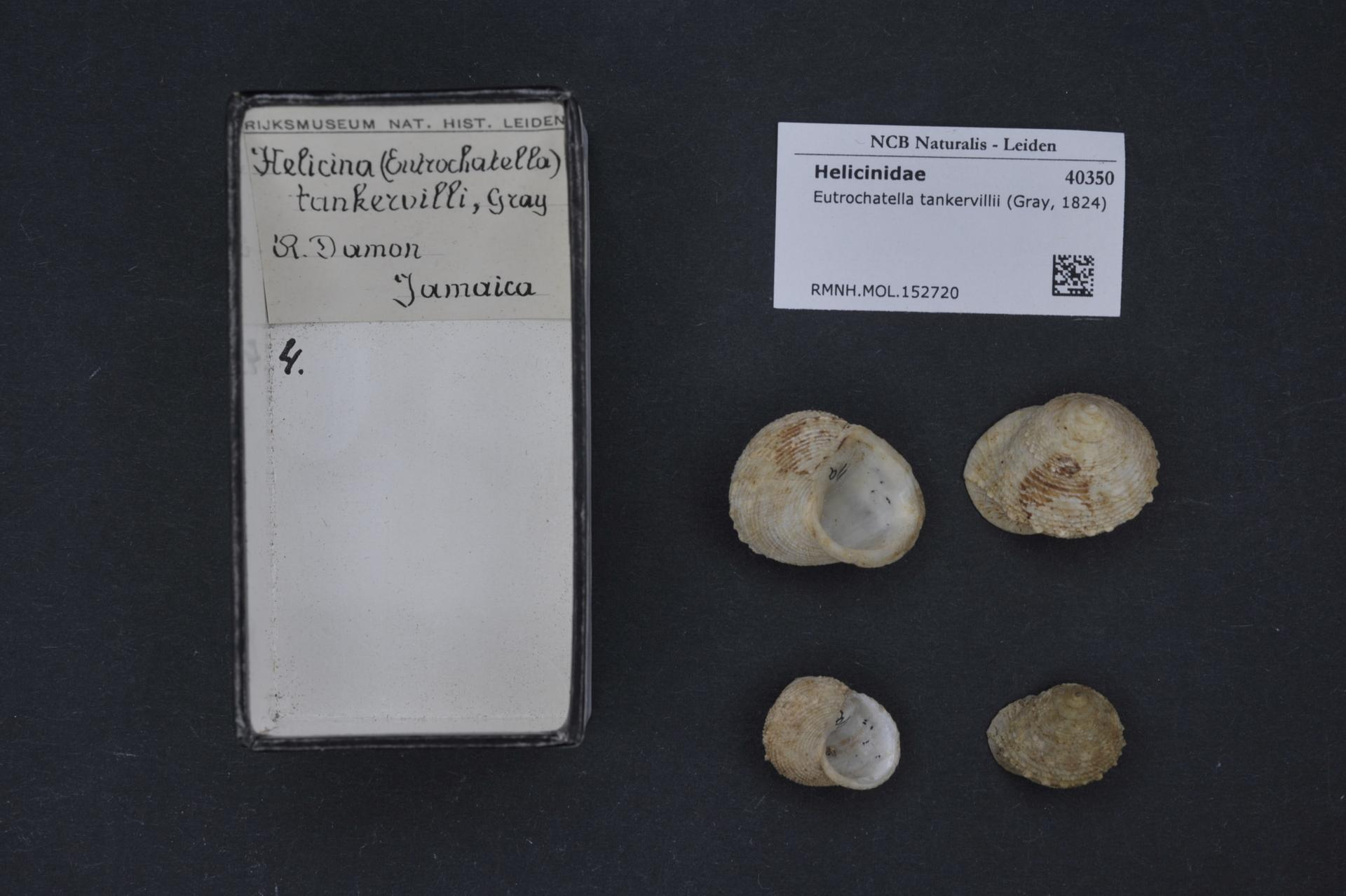
- Eutrochatella tankervillii shells

Scientific classification
- Domain: Eukaryota
- Kingdom: Animalia
- Phylum: Mollusca
- Class: Gastropoda
- Subclass: Neritimorpha
- Order: Cycloneritida
- Family: Helicinidae
- Genus: Eutrochatella
- Species: E. tankervillii

Binomial name
- Eutrochatella tankervillii (Gray, 1824)

Synonyms
- Helicina tankervillii Gray, 1824; Eutrochatella tankervillei (orth. error)

= Eutrochatella tankervillii =

Species of gastropod

Eutrochatella tankervillii is a species of tropical land snail with an operculum, a terrestrial gastropod mollusc in the family Helicinidae.

The specific name tankervillii is in honor of Charles Bennet, 4th Earl of Tankerville.

== Distribution ==
Jamaica.

== Description ==
Circulatory system: The osmotic pressure of the hemolymph of Eutrochatella tankervillii is 67 mOsm.
