= Dimorphoptychia =

Dimorphoptychia Temporal range: Eocene

Scientific classification
- Kingdom: Animalia
- Phylum: Mollusca
- Class: Gastropoda
- Order: Cycloneritida
- Family: Helicinidae
- Genus: †Dimorphoptychia; Sandberger, 1871

Extinct genus of gastropods

Dimorphoptychia is an extinct genus of land snails with an operculum, terrestrial gastropod mollusks in the family Helicinidae.

Dimorphoptychia is the type genus of the subfamily Dimorphoptychiinae, which is likewise fully extinct today.

== Species ==
Species within the genus Dimorphoptychia include:

- Dimorphoptychia? changzhouensis Yu, 1977
