= Glyptemoda =

Scientific classification
- Kingdom: Animalia
- Phylum: Mollusca
- Class: Gastropoda
- Order: Cycloneritida
- Family: Helicinidae
- Subfamily: Helicininae
- Genus: Glyptemoda; Clench & Aguayo, 1950

Type species
- Helicina torrei J. B. Henderson, 1909

Genus of gastropods

Glyptemoda is a genus of land snails with an operculum, terrestrial gastropod mollusks in the family Helicinidae. It is endemic to Cuba. The genus is monotypic, the only species being Glyptemoda torrei (Henderson, 1909). However, two subspecies are recognized:

- Glyptemoda torrei freirei (Clench & Aguayo, 1950)
- Glyptemoda torrei torrei (J. B. Henderson, 1909)

Glyptemoda torrei torrei can reach almost 30 mm (1.2 in) in size, whereas Glyptemoda torrei freirei is smaller.
