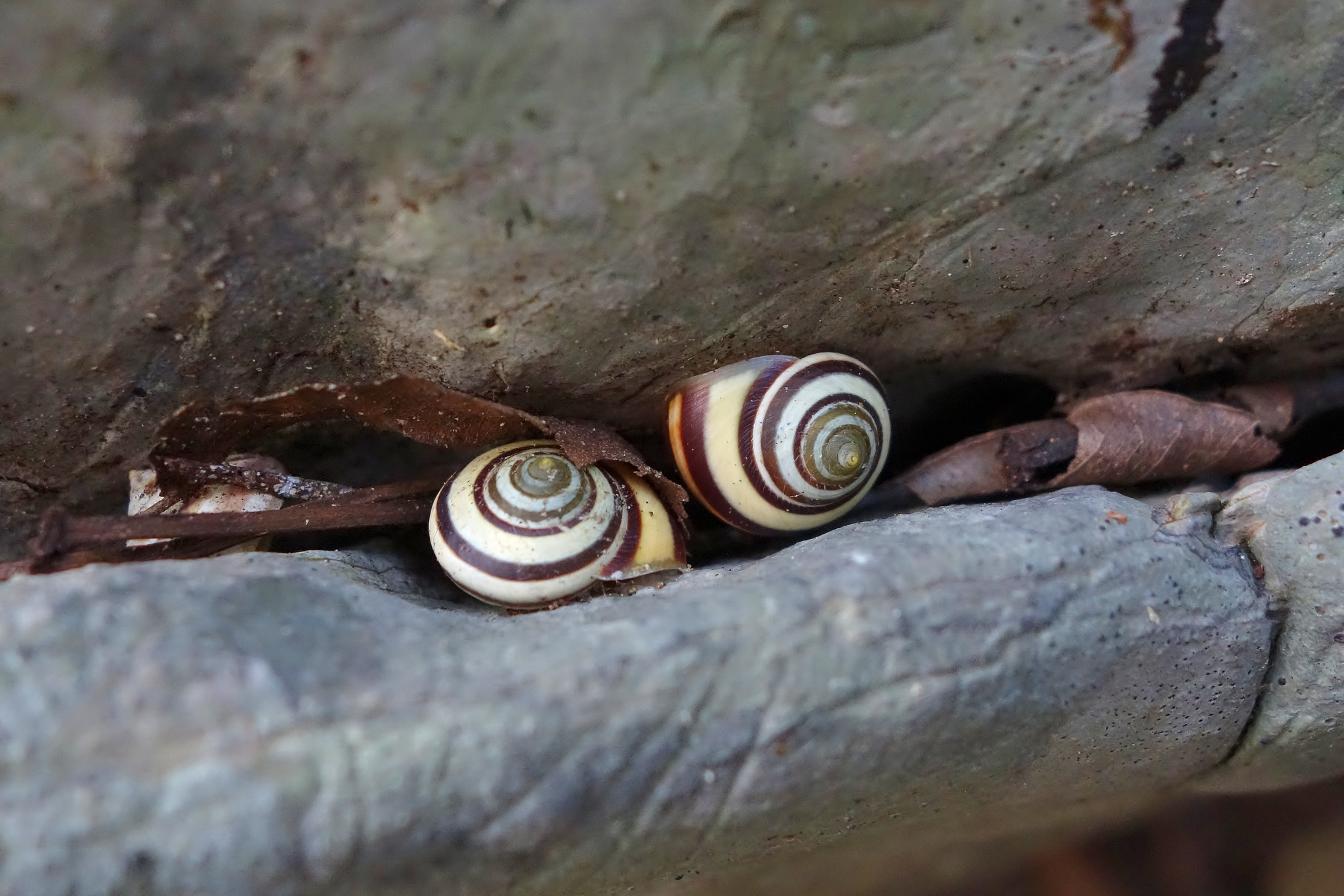
- Viana regina

Scientific classification
- Kingdom: Animalia
- Phylum: Mollusca
- Class: Gastropoda
- Order: Cycloneritida
- Family: Helicinidae
- Subfamily: Vianinae
- Genus: Viana; H. Adams & A. Adams, 1856

Synonyms
- Fitzia Guppy, 1895; Hapata Gray, 1856; Helicina (Hapata) Gray, 1856 (a junior synonym); Rhynchocheila Shuttleworth, 1877; Trochatella (Viana) H. & A. Adams, 1856 (original combination)

= Viana (gastropod) =

Genus of gastropods

Viana is a genus of land snails with an operculum, terrestrial gastropod mollusks in the family Helicinidae.

Viana is the type genus of the subfamily Vianinae.

== Species ==
Species within the genus Viana include:

- Viana regina (Morelet, 1849)
