= Sturanyella =

Scientific classification
- Kingdom: Animalia
- Phylum: Mollusca
- Class: Gastropoda
- Order: Cycloneritida
- Family: Helicinidae
- Genus: Sturanyella; Pilsbry & Cooke, 1934

Genus of gastropods

Sturanyella is a genus of land snails with an operculum, terrestrial gastropod mollusks in the family Helicinidae, the helicinids.

The specific name Sturanyella is apparently in honor of Rudolf Sturany (1867-1935), a malacologist from Austria.

== Species ==
Species within the genus Sturanyella include:

- Sturanyella carolinarum
- Sturanyella epicharis
- Sturanyella plicatilis Mouss. - the type species
