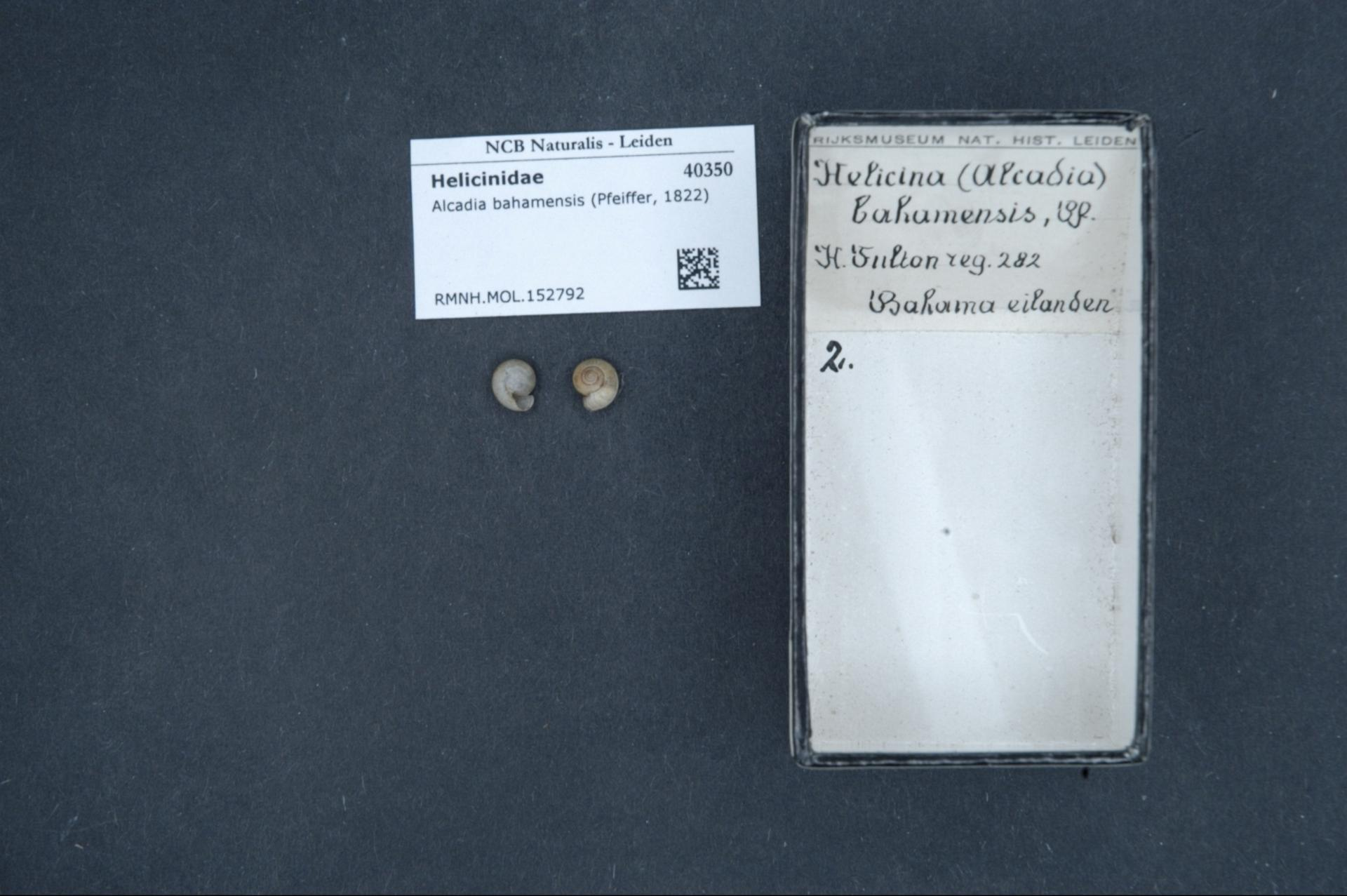
- Shell of Alcadia bahamensis (specimen at Naturalis Biodiversity Center)

Scientific classification
- Kingdom: Animalia
- Phylum: Mollusca
- Class: Gastropoda
- Order: Cycloneritida
- Family: Helicinidae
- Genus: Alcadia
- Species: A. bahamensis

Binomial name
- Alcadia bahamensis (L. Pfeiffer, 1862)

Synonyms
- Helicina (Schasicheila) bahamensis (L. Pfeiffer, 1862); Schasicheila bahamensis L. Pfeiffer, 1862

= Alcadia bahamensis =

Species of gastropod

Alcadia bahamensis is a species of an operculate land snail, terrestrial gastropod mollusk in the family Helicinidae.

== Description ==
The shell is 3.5 mm (0.14 in) high, its greatest diameter 6.5 mm (0.26 in).

The shell is depressed, somewhat thin, and finely striated with small wrinkles. It is reddish under a deciduous epidermis, arranged in rows of bristles. The spire is hardly elevated and has a minute apex. The suture is impressed, and there are 4.5 somewhat flattened whorls. The body whorl is slightly depressed and has a thin callus in the middle underneath. The columella is simple and receding, ending in a small tooth at the base. The aperture is nearly diagonal and somewhat semicircular. The peristome is simple and straight, with the right margin incised at the top, then angularly produced, and the basal margin sinuate near the tooth of the columella. The operculum is typical.

== Distribution ==
This species occurs on the Bahamas.
