= Sturanya laciniosa =

Scientific classification
- Domain: Eukaryota
- Kingdom: Animalia
- Phylum: Mollusca
- Class: Gastropoda
- Subclass: Neritimorpha
- Order: Cycloneritida
- Family: Helicinidae
- Genus: Sturanya
- Species: S. laciniosa

Binomial name
- Sturanya laciniosa (Mighels, 1945)

Species of land snail

== Sturanya laciniosa ==
Sturanya laciniosa is a terrestrial pulmonate gastropod in the family Helicinidae endemic to Hawaii. It is also known as Pūpū kua mauna in Hawaiian. Several varieties are known from different islands.

== Description ==
Sturanya laciniosa has a cinnamon-brown shell with yellowish zigzag stripes. Spire consist of five flattened whorls, the final one being obtusely angular with two or three raised revolving lines on it. Their diet consists of microbial community that grows on trees.

== Distribution and habitat ==
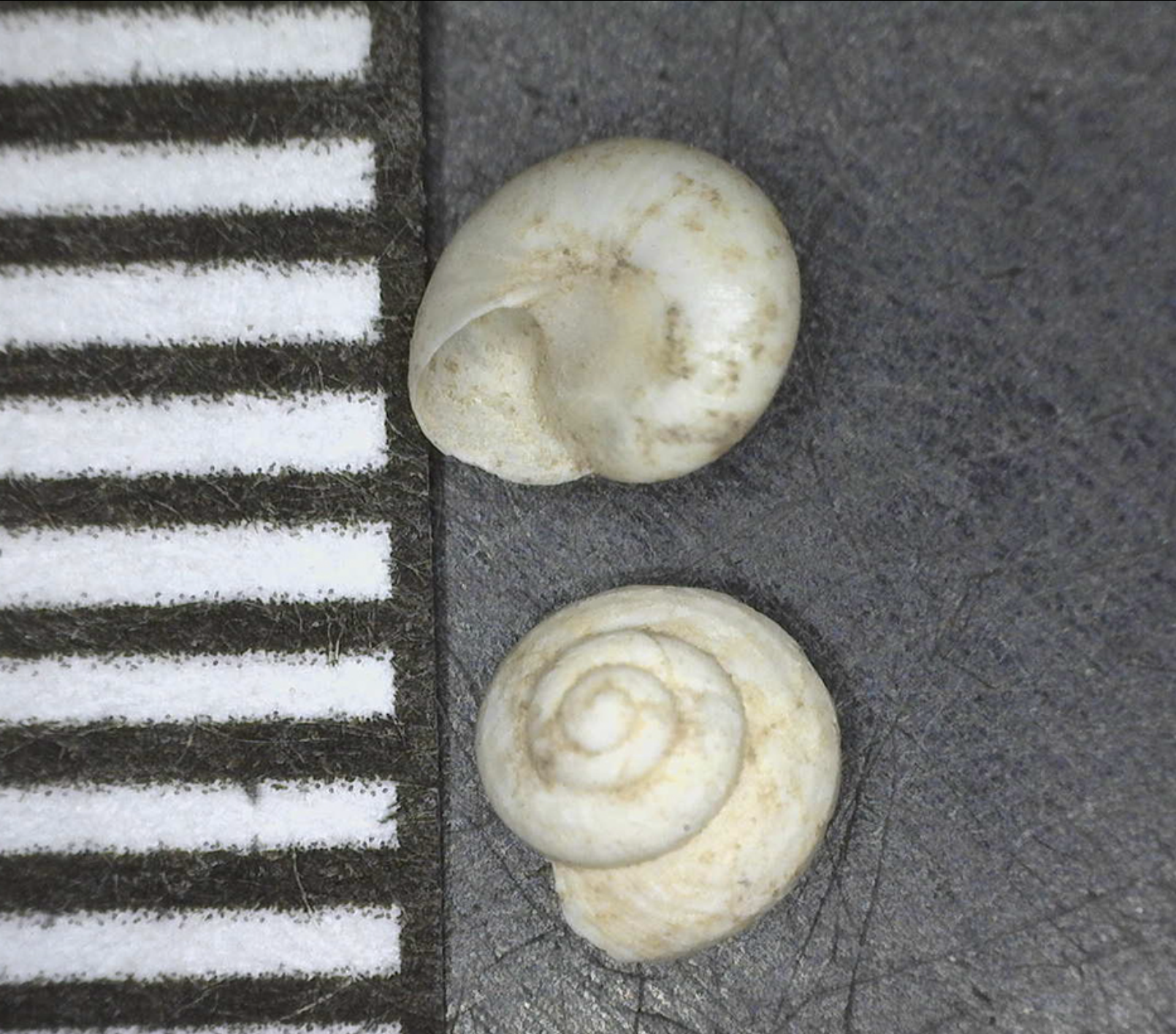
Sturanya Laciniosa

Sturanya laciniosa is endemic to Hawaii. Sturanya laciniosa once inhabited coastal areas, such as Kaena Point on O'ahu.
