= Emoda =

Scientific classification
- Domain: Eukaryota
- Kingdom: Animalia
- Phylum: Mollusca
- Class: Gastropoda
- Subclass: Neritimorpha
- Order: Cycloneritida
- Family: Helicinidae
- Genus: Emoda; Adams, 1856

Genus of gastropods

Emoda is a genus of land snails with an operculum, terrestrial gastropod mollusks in the family Helicinidae.

== Species ==
Species within the genus Emoda include:

- Emoda bayamensis (Poey, 1854)
- Emoda bermudezi Aguayo & Jaume, 1954
- Emoda blanesi Clench & Aguayo in Aguayo, 1953
- Emoda briarea (Poey, 1851)
- Emoda caledoniensis Clench & Jacobson, 1971
- Emoda ciliata (Poey, 1852)
- Emoda clementis Clench & Aguayo, 1950
- Emoda emoda (Pfeiffer, 1865)
- Emoda mayarina (Poey, 1854)
- Emoda najazaensis Aguayo & Jaume, 1954
- Emoda pulcherrima (Lea, 1834)
- Emoda sagraiana (d’Orbigny, 1842)
- Emoda silacea (Morelet, 1849)
- Emoda submarginata (Gray, 1824)
