= Calidviana =

Scientific classification
- Kingdom: Animalia
- Phylum: Mollusca
- Class: Gastropoda
- Order: Cycloneritida
- Family: Helicinidae
- Genus: Calidviana; Baker, 1954

Genus of gastropods

Calidviana is a genus of tropical and subtropical land snails with an operculum, terrestrial gastropod mollusks in the family Helicinidae.

== Species ==
Species within the genus Calidviana include:

- Calidviana littoricola (Gundlach in Pfeiffer, 1860)
