= Priotrochatella =

Scientific classification
- Kingdom: Animalia
- Phylum: Mollusca
- Class: Gastropoda
- Order: Cycloneritida
- Family: Helicinidae
- Genus: Priotrochatella; Fischer, 1893

Genus of gastropods

Priotrochatella is a genus of land snails with an operculum, terrestrial gastropod mollusks in the family Helicinidae. Priotroachatella occur on calcareous rocks and in caves in the same rocks on Cuban islands - they are critically endangered because of the exploitation of the marble quarries that form their habitat.

== Species ==
Species within the genus Priotrochatella include:

- Priotrochatella constellata (Morelet, 1847)
- Priotrochatella stellata (Velazquez in Poey, 1852)
- Priotrochatella torrei Clapp, 1918
