= Proserpinellidae =

Scientific classification
- Kingdom: Animalia
- Phylum: Mollusca
- Class: Gastropoda
- Order: Cycloneritida
- Superfamily: Helicinoidea
- Family: Proserpinellidae; H. B. Baker, 1923

Synonyms
- Ceresinae Thiele, 1925

Family of gastropods

Proserpinellidae is a taxonomic family of land snails with an operculum, terrestrial gastropod mollusks in the superfamily Helicinoidea.

This family has no subfamilies according to the taxonomy of the Gastropoda by Bouchet & Rocroi, 2005.

== Genera ==
Genera within the family Proserpinellidae include:

- Proserpinella Bland, 1865, the type genus.
