= Semitrochatella =

Scientific classification
- Kingdom: Animalia
- Phylum: Mollusca
- Class: Gastropoda
- Order: Cycloneritida
- Family: Helicinidae
- Genus: Semitrochatella; Aguayo & Jaume, 1958

Genus of molluscs

Semitrochatella is a genus of land snails with an operculum, terrestrial gastropod mollusks in the family Helicinidae.

== Species ==
Species within the genus Semitrochatella include:

- Semitrochatella alboviridis (Wright in Pfeiffer, 1864)
- Semitrochatella babei (Arango, 1876)
- Semitrochatella conica (Pfeiffer, 1839)
- Semitrochatella elongata (d’Orbigny, 1842)
- Semitrochatella fuscula (Gundlach in Pfeiffer, 1863)
