= Troschelviana =

Scientific classification
- Kingdom: Animalia
- Phylum: Mollusca
- Class: Gastropoda
- Order: Cycloneritida
- Family: Helicinidae
- Genus: Troschelviana; Baker, 1922

Synonyms
- Torreviana Aguayo, 1943; Troschelviana (Cubaviana) H.B. Baker, 1922· accepted, alternate representation; Troschelviana (Microviana) H.B. Baker, 1928· accepted, alternate representation; Troschelviana (Troschelviana) H.B. Baker, 1922· accepted, alternate representation

Genus of gastropods

Troschelviana is a genus of land snails with an operculum, terrestrial gastropod mollusks in the family Helicinidae.

== Species ==
Species within the genus Troschelviana include:

- Troschelviana callosa (Poey, 1854)
- Troschelviana chrysochasma (Poey, 1853)
- Troschelviana continua (Gundlach in Pfeiffer, 1858)
- Troschelviana erythraea (Wright in Sowerby, 1866)
- Troschelviana granulum (Gundlach in Pfeiffer, 1864)
- Troschelviana hians (Poey, 1852)
- Troschelviana holguinensis (Aguayo, 1932)
- Troschelviana jugulata (Poey, 1858)
- Troschelviana mestrei (Arango, 1879)
- Troschelviana methfesseli (Pfeiffer, 1862)
- Troschelviana petitiana (d’Orbigny, 1842)
- Troschelviana pfeifferiana (Arango in Pfeiffer, 1866)
- Troschelviana pyramidalis (Sowerby, 1842)
- Troschelviana rubromarginata (Gundlach in Poey, 1858)
- Troschelviana rupestris (Pfeiffer, 1839)
- Troschelviana scopulorum (Morelet, 1849)
- Troschelviana spinipoma (Aguayo, 1943)
- Troschelviana tumidula (Clench & Aguayo, 1957)
