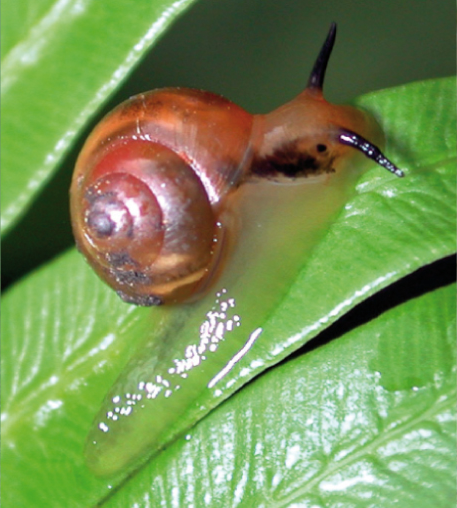
- Alcadia conuloides

Scientific classification
- Kingdom: Animalia
- Phylum: Mollusca
- Class: Gastropoda
- Order: Cycloneritida
- Family: Helicinidae
- Genus: Alcadia
- Species: A. conuloides

Binomial name
- Alcadia conuloides (Guppy, 1868)

Synonyms
- Helicina conuloides Guppy, 1868; Alcadia (Idesa)? conuloides Baker, 1927

= Alcadia conuloides =

Species of gastropod

Alcadia conuloides is a species of tropical land snail with an operculum, a terrestrial gastropod mollusk in the family Helicinidae.

== Taxonomy ==
Robert John Lechmere Guppy (1895) considered this species synonymous with the taxon Schrammia schrammia (Crosse, 1872) from Guadeloupe, but that species is larger and higher-spired, and therefore Guppy's name was resurrected. Horace Burrington Baker (1927) suggested that Guppy's species probably belongs in the genus Alcadia, subgenus Idesa. Until the status of Schrammia and its two species can be resolved, we follow the last published work, that of Baker (1927).

== Distribution ==
This species is endemic to the West Indian island of Dominica.

== Ecology ==
This small species lives on wet leaves, being particularly active after rainfall, and on damp leaf litter. It is believed to feed on encrusting algae.
