= Proserpinidae =

Scientific classification
- Kingdom: Animalia
- Phylum: Mollusca
- Class: Gastropoda
- Order: Cycloneritida
- Superfamily: Helicinoidea
- Family: Proserpinidae; J. E. Gray, 1847

Synonyms
- Despoenidae Newton, 1891

Family of gastropods

Proserpinidae is a taxonomic family of small land snails with an operculum, gastropod mollusks in the superfamily Helicinoidea (according to the taxonomy of the Gastropoda by Bouchet & Rocroi, 2005).

This family has no subfamilies according to the taxonomy of the Gastropoda by Bouchet & Rocroi, 2005.

== Genera ==
Genera within the family Proserpinidae include:

- Proserpina G. B. Sowerby II, 1839 - type genus of the family
