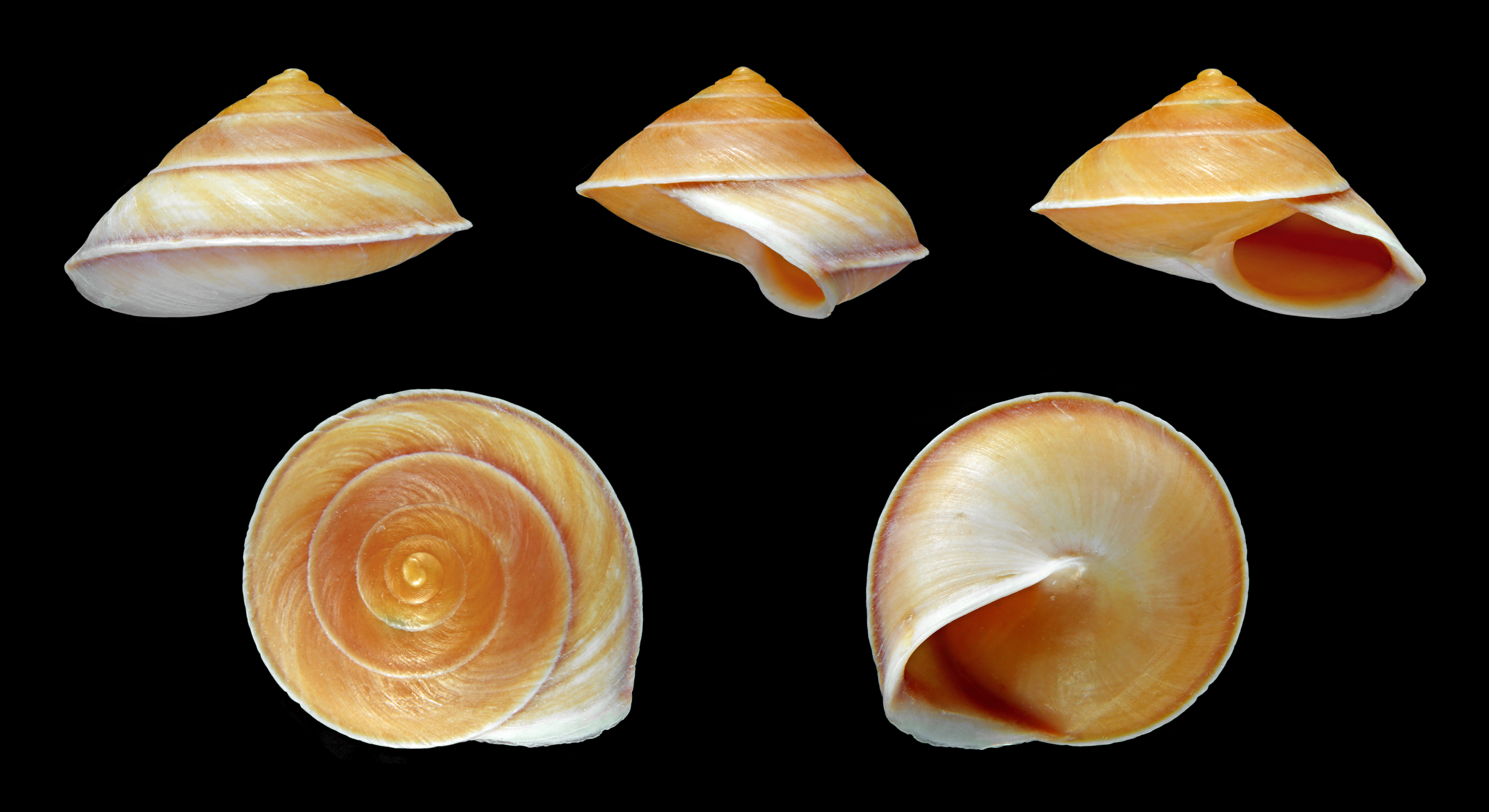
- Five views of a shell of Geophorus agglutinans

Scientific classification
- Kingdom: Animalia
- Phylum: Mollusca
- Class: Gastropoda
- Order: Cycloneritida
- Family: Helicinidae
- Genus: Geophorus; Fischer, 1885

= Geophorus =

Genus of gastropods

Geophorus is a genus of tropical and subtropical land snails with an operculum, terrestrial gastropod mollusks in the family Helicinidae.

== Species ==
Species within the genus Geophorus include:

- Geophorus acutissima
- Geophorus agglutinans
- Geophorus lazarus
- Geophorus oxytropis
- Geophorus romblonensis
- Geophorus tagbilleranus
- Geophorus trochaceus

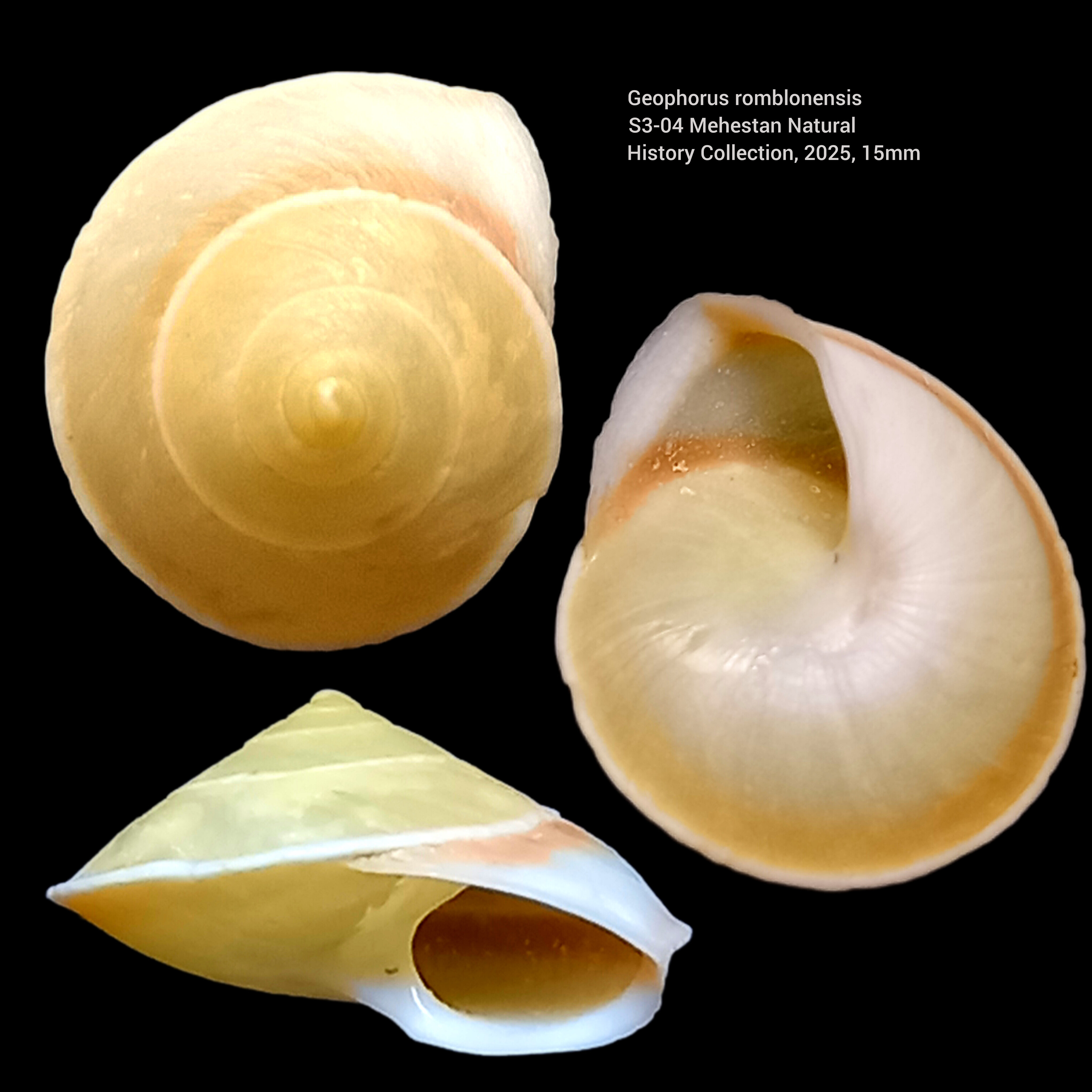
Geophorus romblonensis
