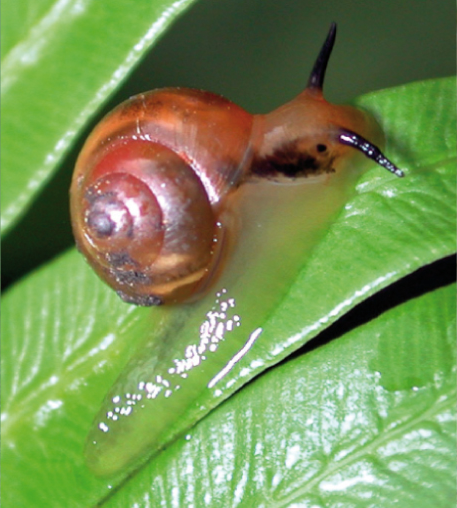
- Alcadia conuloides

Scientific classification
- Kingdom: Animalia
- Phylum: Mollusca
- Class: Gastropoda
- Order: Cycloneritida
- Superfamily: Helicinoidea; A. Férussac, 1822

Families
- See text

= Helicinoidea =

Superfamily of gastropods

Helicinoidea is a taxonomic superfamily of land snails that have an operculum. In other words, they are terrestrial operculate gastropod mollusks. They are in the order Cycloneritida and are quite closely related to the marine and freshwater nerites.

== Taxonomy ==
The following families are assigned to this taxon:

- family Helicinidae
- † family Dawsonellidae
- † family Deianiridae
- family Neritiliidae
- family Proserpinellidae
- family Proserpinidae

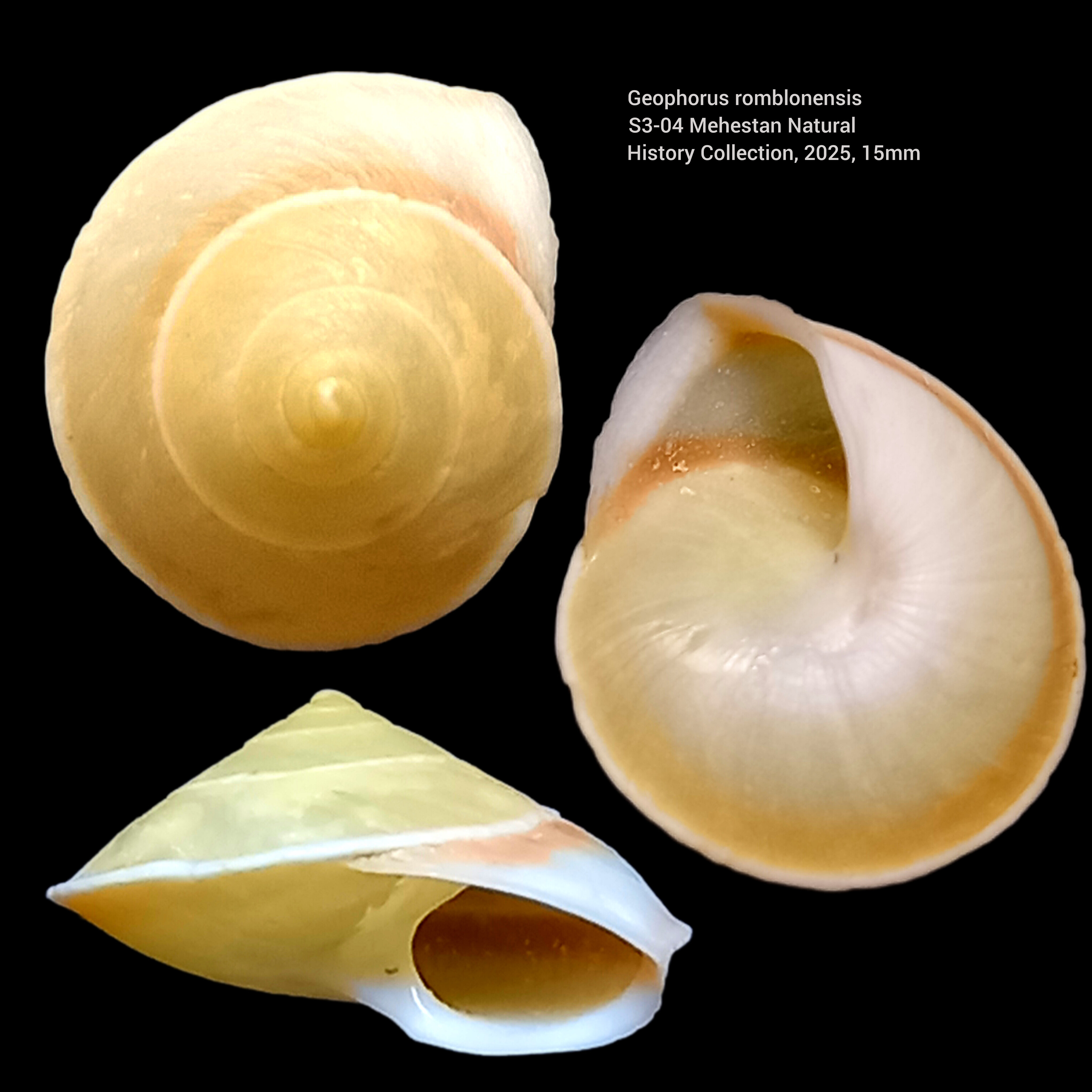
Geophorus romblonensis, family Helicinidae
