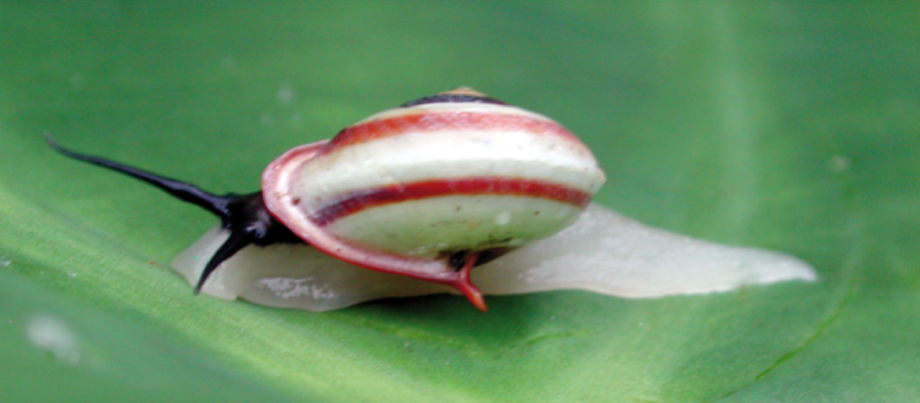
- A live individual of Helicina rhodostoma
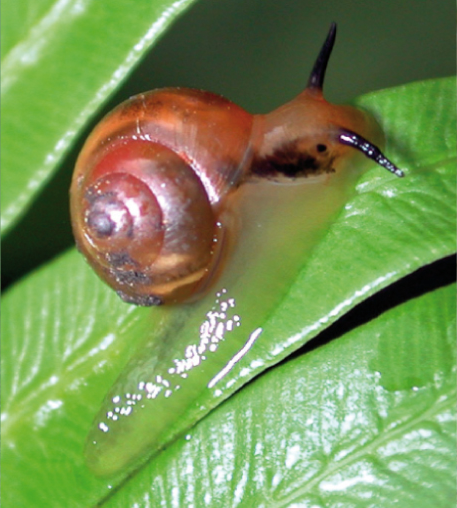
- A live individual of Alcadia conuloides

Scientific classification
- Kingdom: Animalia
- Phylum: Mollusca
- Class: Gastropoda
- Order: Cycloneritida
- Superfamily: Helicinoidea
- Family: Helicinidae; Férussac, 1822

Genera
- See text

Diversity
- 770-1400 species (estimation)

= Helicinidae =

Family of gastropods

Helicinidae is a family of small tropical land snails, terrestrial operculate gastropod mollusks in the superfamily Helicinoidea.

== Name ==
These snails are not at all closely related to the air-breathing land snails, despite a superficial similarity of the shells. The name "Helicinidae" immediately reminds most people of "Helicidae", the most well-known group of land snails including e.g. Helix pomatia, but the important two letters "ni" only from the Latin diminutive of the latter name alluding to superficial similarities of otherwise completely different things.

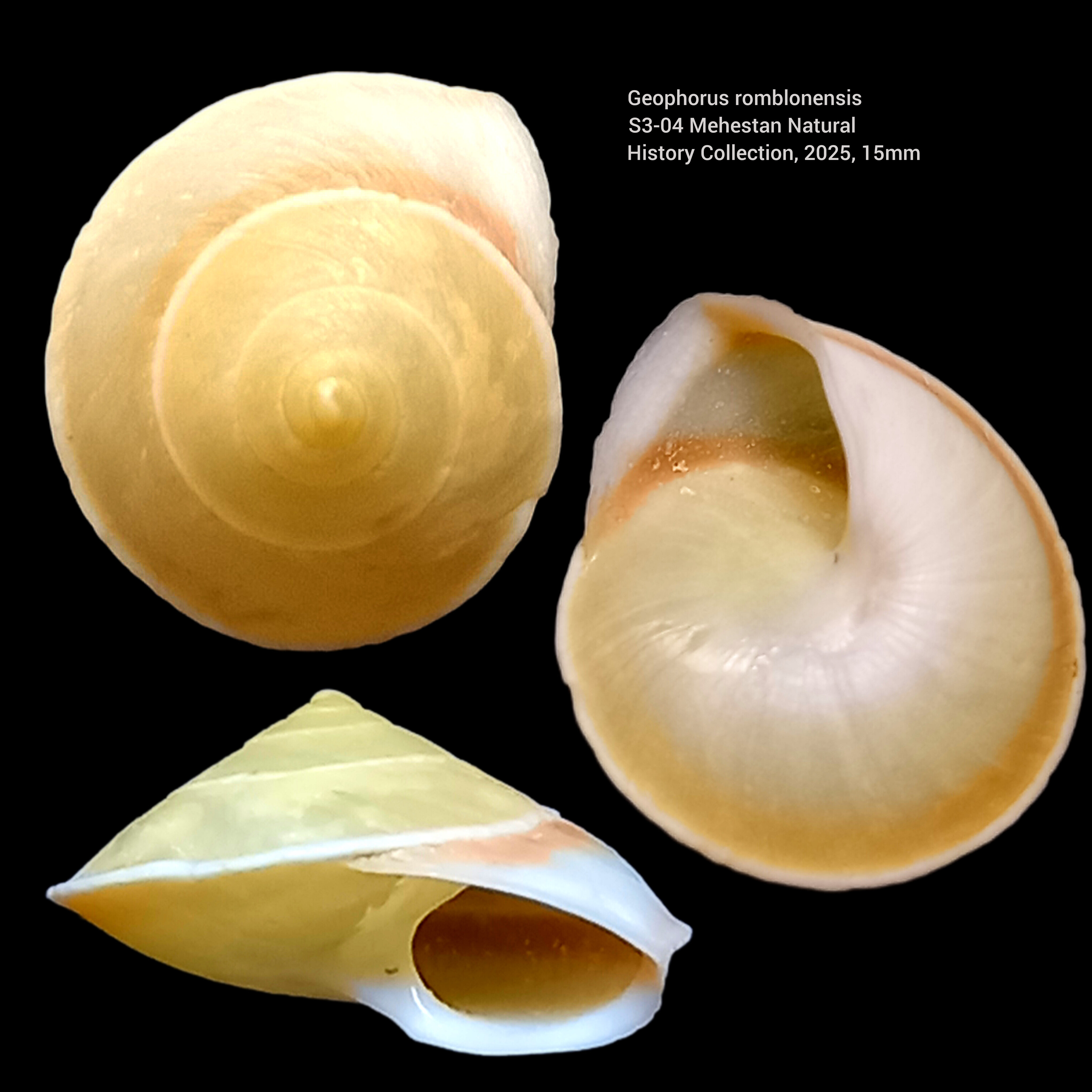
Geophorus romblonensis

== Distribution ==
These snails are found in tropical and subtropical areas but they have an odd distribution: they are restricted to the Caribbean islands and some Indo-Pacific and Pacific islands, as well as the edge of the Asian and Australian continents. Some species are found in the southern United States, from Louisiana to Florida; others in Central and South America.

== Taxonomy ==
Helicinidae belongs to superfamily Helicinoidea according to the taxonomy of the Gastropoda by Bouchet & Rocroi, 2005).

This family consists of six following subfamilies (according to the taxonomy of the Gastropoda by Bouchet & Rocroi, 2005):

- Helicininae Férussac, 1822 - synonym: Olygyridae Gray, 1847; Bourcierinae Paetel, 1890
- Ceratodiscinae Pilsbry, 1927
- † Dimorphoptychiinae Wenz, 1938
- Hendersoniinae H. B. Baker, 1926
- Stoastomatinae C. B. Adams, 1849
- Vianinae H. B. Baker, 1922

== Genera ==
Genera within the family Helicinidae include:

Subfamily Helicininae

- Alcadia Gray, 1840
- Aphanoconia A. J. Wagner, 1905
- Bourciera Pfeiffer, 1852
- Ceochasma F. G. Thompson, 1968
- Ceratopoma Möllendorff, 1893
- Emoda Adams, 1856
- Glyptemoda Clench & Aguayo, 1950
- Helicina Lamarck, 1799 - type genus of the family Helicinidae
- Hemipoma Wagner, 1905
- Kosmetopoma A. J. Wagner, 1905
- Negopenia Iredale, 1941
- Nesiocina Richling & Bouchet, 2013
- Ogasawarana Wagner, 1905
- Olygyra Say, 1818: synonym of Helicina Lamarck, 1799 (original rank)
- Orobophana Wagner, 1905
- Palaeohelicina A. J. Wagner, 1905
- Pecoviana Iredale, 1941
- Pleuropoma Moellendorff, 1893
- Schasicheila Shuttleworth, 1852
- Stoastomops Baker, 1924
- Sturanya Wagner, 1905
- Sulfurina Möllendorff, 1893

subfamily Ceratodiscinae

- Ceratodiscus Simpson & Henderson, 1901 - type genus of the subfamily Ceratodiscinae

Subfamily † Dimorphoptychiinae

- † Dimorphoptychia Sandberger, 1871 - type genus of the subfamily Dimorphoptychiinae

Subfamily Hendersoniinae

- Hendersonia A. J. Wagner, 1905 - type genus of the subfamily Hendersoniinae
- Waldemaria Wagner, 1905

Subfamily Stoastomatinae

- Stoastoma C. B. Adams, 1849 - type genus of the subfamily Stoastomatinae

Subfamily Vianinae

- Calidviana Baker, 1954
- Calybium Morelet, 1891
- Eutrochatella Fischer, 1885
- Geophorus Fischer, 1885
- Heudeia Crosse, 1885
- Lucidella Swainson, 1840
- Pseudotrochatella Nevill, 1881
- Pyrgodomus Fischer & Crosse, 1893
- Viana H. Adams & A. Adams, 1856 - type genus of the subfamily Vianinae

Subfamily ?

- Priotrochatella Fischer, 1893
- Semitrochatella Aguayo & Jaume, 1958
- Sturanyella Pilsbry & Cooke, 1934
- Troschelviana Baker, 1922
- Ustronia Kobelt, 1908
