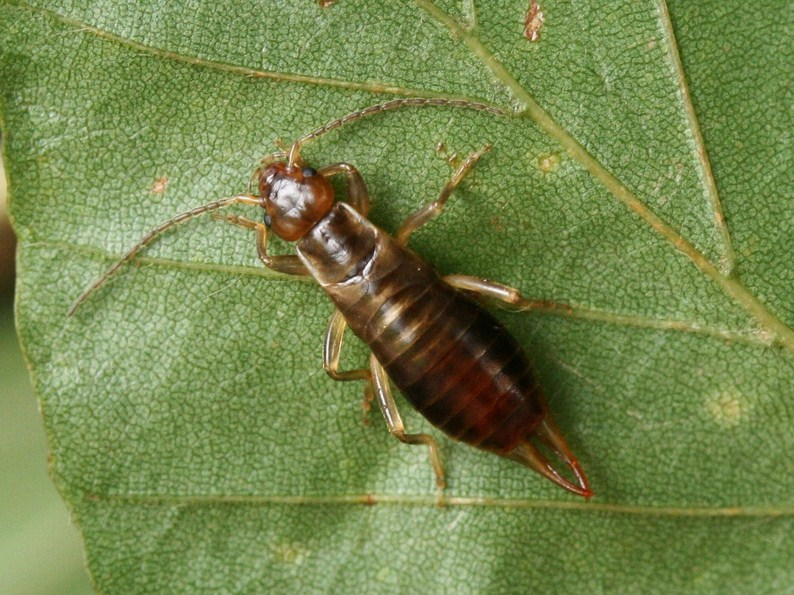
- C. acanthopygia female

Scientific classification
- Kingdom: Animalia
- Phylum: Arthropoda
- Class: Insecta
- Order: Dermaptera
- Family: Forficulidae
- Subfamily: Anechurinae
- Genus: Chelidurella
- Species: C. acanthopygia

Binomial name
- Chelidurella acanthopygia (Géné, 1832)

Synonyms
- Forficula aptera (Schmidt, 1866); Chelidurella guentheri Galvagni, 1994; Forficula xanthopygia (Schmidt, 1866)

= Chelidurella acanthopygia =

Species of earwigs

Chelidurella acanthopygia is the type species of European earwigs in the genus Chelidurella (family Forficulidae); it was first described by Géné in 1832 (as Forficula acanthopygia). Records of occurrence are from: Austria, Belgium, Bosnia and Herzegovina, Croatia, Czech Republic, Denmark, England, Germany, Hungary, Italy, Latvia, Lithuania, Netherlands, Norway, Poland, Romania, Russia, Serbia, Slovakia, Slovenia, Sweden, Switzerland and Ukraine.
