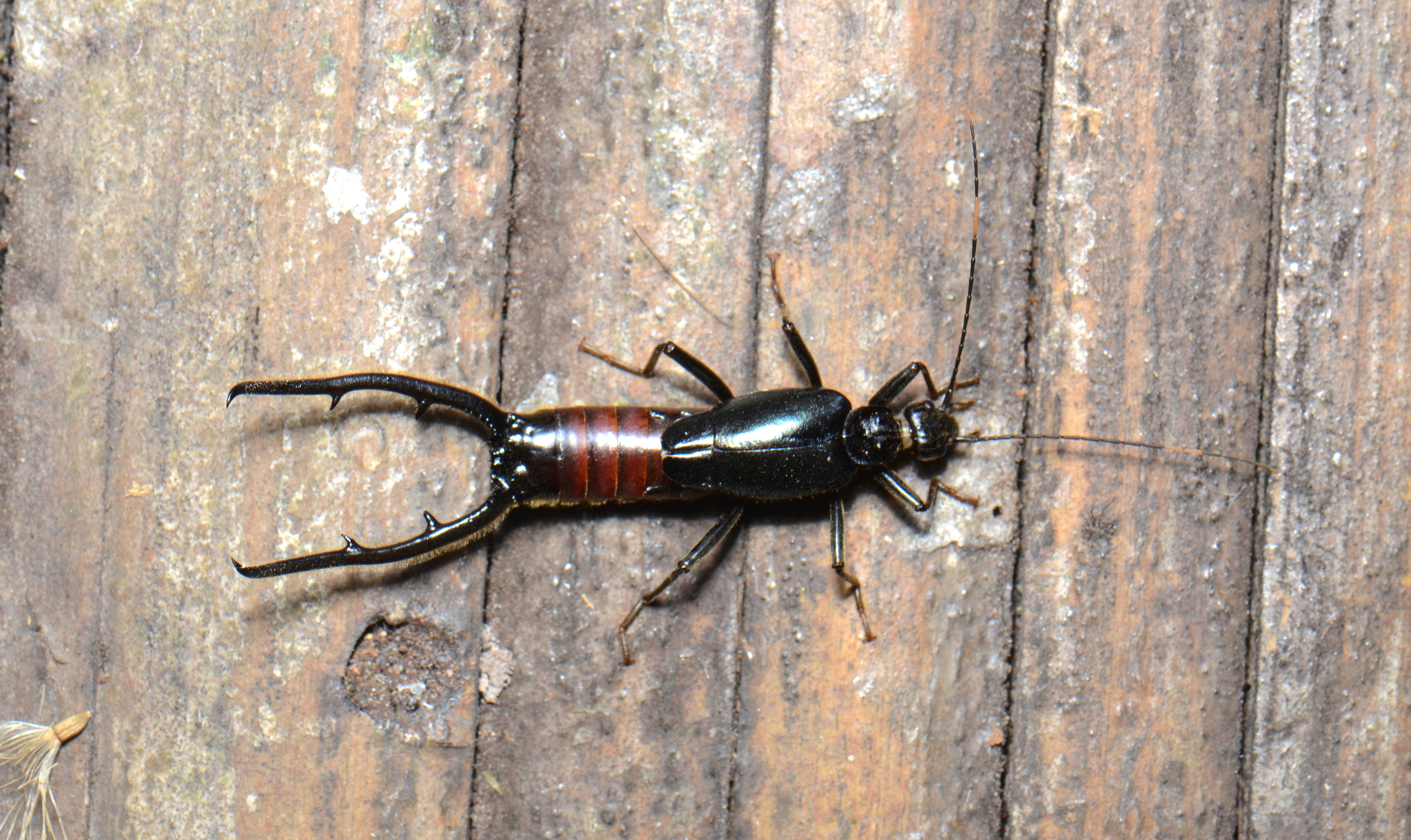
- Opisthocosmia sp.

Scientific classification
- Domain: Eukaryota
- Kingdom: Animalia
- Phylum: Arthropoda
- Class: Insecta
- Order: Dermaptera
- Suborder: Neodermaptera
- Infraorder: Epidermaptera
- Superfamily: Forficuloidea
- Family: Forficulidae
- Subfamily: Opisthocosmiinae; Verhoeff, 1902

= Opisthocosmiinae =

Subfamily of earwigs

Opisthocosmiinae is a subfamily of earwigs in the family Forficulidae. There are more than 100 described species in Opisthocosmiinae, recorded especially from Asia and the Americas.

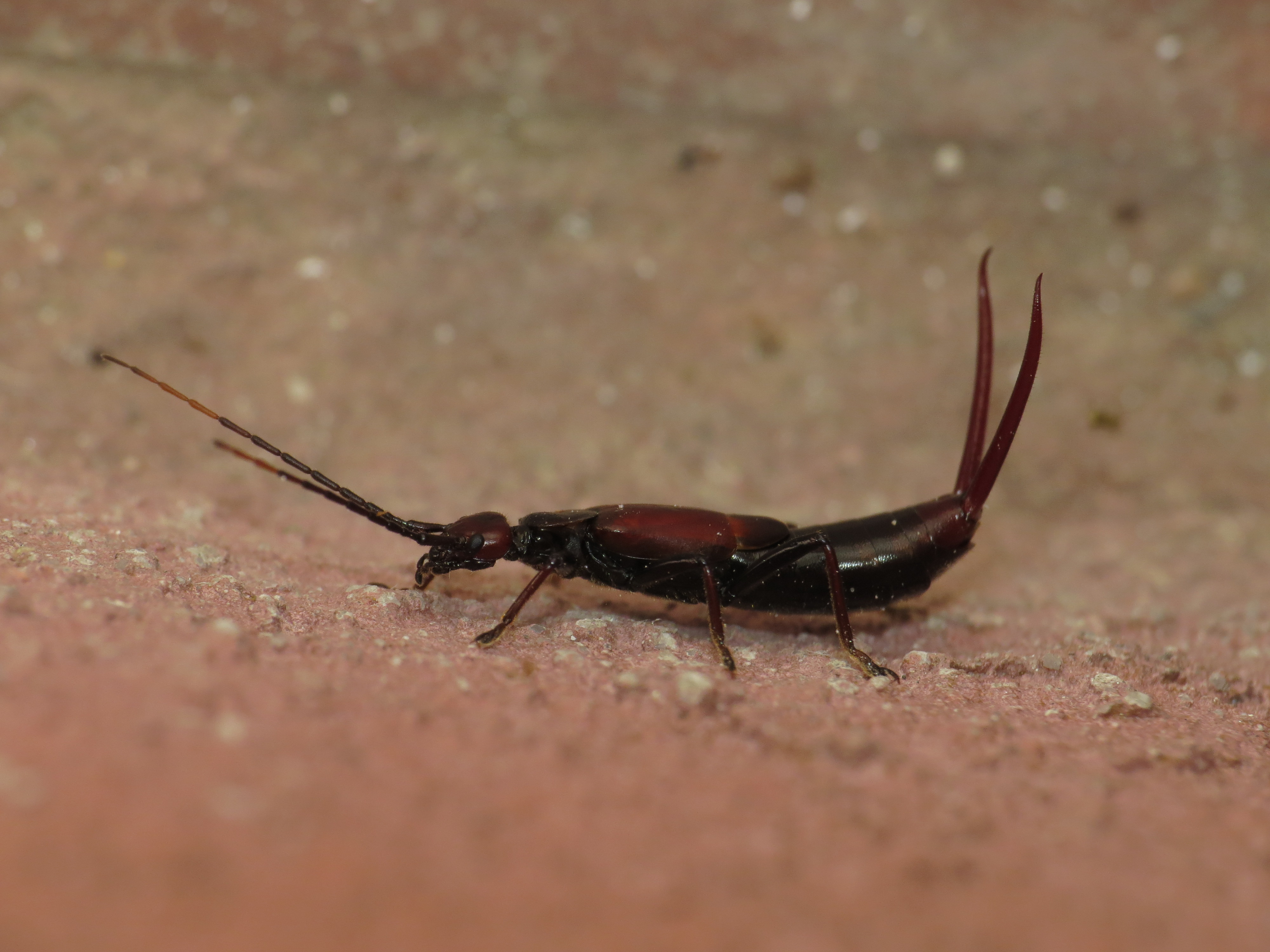
Timomenus komarowi

== Genera ==
These 18 genera belong to the subfamily Opisthocosmiinae:

- Acanthocordax Günther, 1929
- Chaetocosmia Nishikawa, 1973
- Cipex Burr, 1910
- Cordax Burr, 1910
- Eparchus Burr, 1907
- Eutimomena Bey-Bienko, 1970
- Hypurgus Burr, 1907
- Neoopisthocosmia Steinmann, 1990
- Opisthocosmia Dohrn, 1865
- Parasondax Srivastava, 1978
- Parasyntonus Steinmann, 1990
- Paratimomenus Steinmann, 1974
- Pareparchus Burr, 1911
- Prosadiya Hebard, 1923
- Sondax Burr, 1910
- Spinosocordax Steinmann, 1988
- Syntonus Burr, 1910
- Timomenus Burr, 1907
