= Chelidura pyrenaica =

Scientific classification
- Kingdom: Animalia
- Phylum: Arthropoda
- Class: Insecta
- Order: Dermaptera
- Family: Forficulidae
- Genus: Chelidura
- Species: C. pyrenaica

Binomial name
- Chelidura pyrenaica (Bonelli, 1832)

Synonyms
- Forficula pyrenaica Bonelli, 1832; Chelidura dilatata (Burmeister, 1838); Forficula dilatata Burmeister, 1838; Chelidura pyrenaica pyrenaica (Bonelli, 1832); Forficula pyrenaica Gené, 1832; Forficula simplex Lafresnaye, 1828; Forficula simplex Germar, 1825

Species of earwig

Chelidura pyrenaica is a species of earwig in the subfamily Anechurinae.
