= Liparura simplex =

Scientific classification
- Domain: Eukaryota
- Kingdom: Animalia
- Phylum: Arthropoda
- Class: Insecta
- Order: Dermaptera
- Family: Forficulidae
- Subfamily: Skendylinae
- Genus: Liparura
- Species: L. simplex

Binomial name
- Liparura simplex Brindle, 1975

Species of insect

Liparura simplex is a species of earwig within the family Forficulidae, found in Bhutan and India. Males of the species are a dark reddish or yellowish-brown coloration, with a black abdomen, yellow antennae, brown basal segments, and reddish-brown legs. The forceps are cylindrical and gradually narrow, with a cruve beyond the midpoint. Females are similar to males, although the forceps are slenderer. Males are 13.5-14 millimeters in length whereas females are 14.5 millimeters in length.
