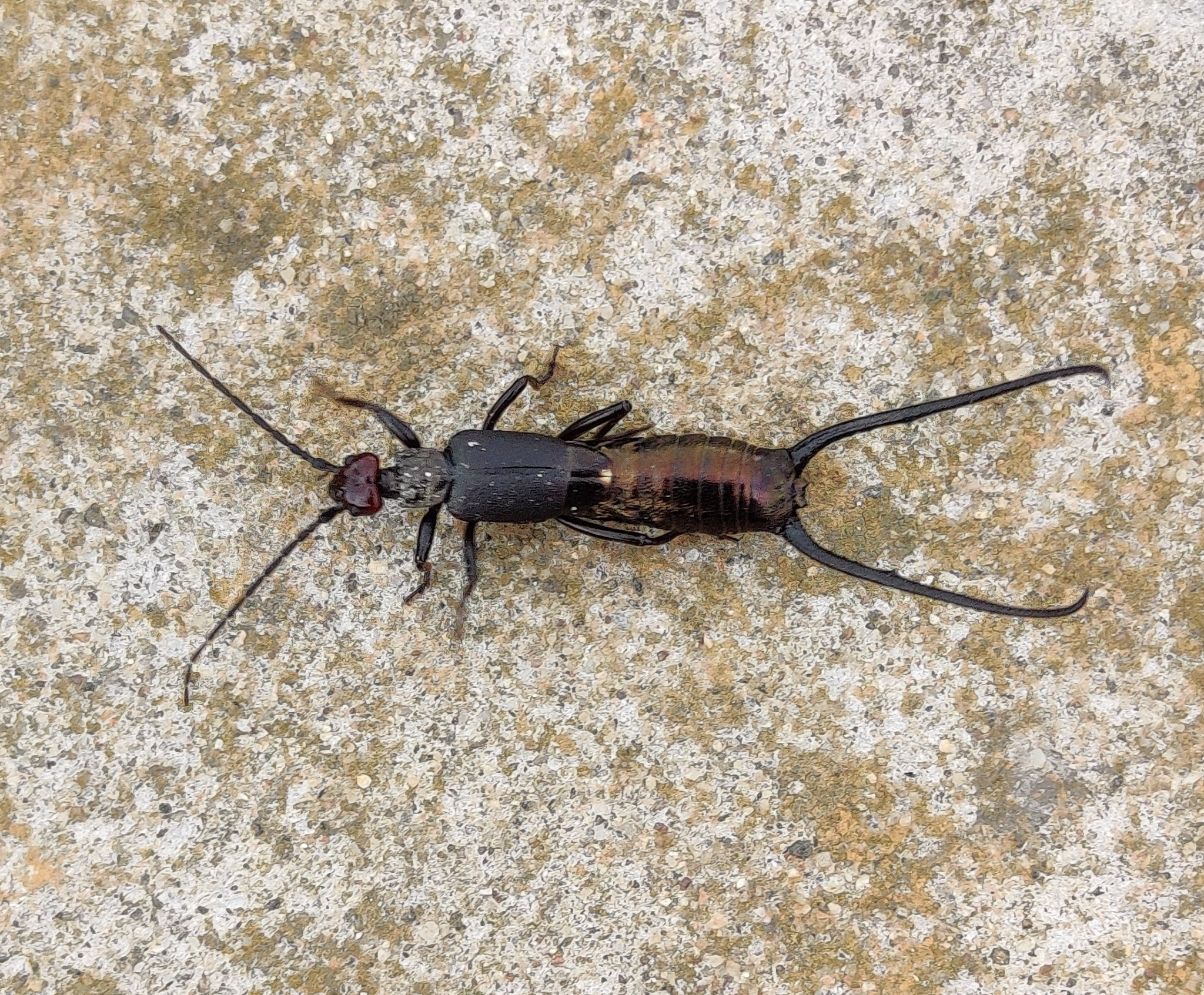
- Eudohrnia metallica

Scientific classification
- Domain: Eukaryota
- Kingdom: Animalia
- Phylum: Arthropoda
- Class: Insecta
- Order: Dermaptera
- Suborder: Neodermaptera
- Infraorder: Epidermaptera
- Superfamily: Forficuloidea
- Family: Forficulidae
- Subfamily: Neolobophorinae; Burr, 1907

= Neolobophorinae =

Subfamily of earwigs

Neolobophorinae is a subfamily of earwigs in the family Forficulidae. There are about 5 genera and 19 described species in Neolobophorinae.

== Genera ==
These five genera belong to the subfamily Neolobophorinae:

- Eudohrnia Burr, 1907
- Metresura Rehn, 1922
- Neolobophora Scudder, 1875
- Setocordax Brindle, 1970
- Tristanella Borelli, 1909
