= Echinosoma =

Scientific classification
- Domain: Eukaryota
- Kingdom: Animalia
- Phylum: Arthropoda
- Class: Insecta
- Order: Dermaptera
- Suborder: Neodermaptera
- Infraorder: Protodermaptera
- Superfamily: Pygidicranoidea
- Family: Pygidicranidae
- Genus: Echinosoma; Audinet-Serville, 1838

Genus of earwigs

Echinosoma is a genus of earwigs in the family Pygidicranidae, erected by Audinet-Serville in 1838.

== Taxonomy ==
Echinosoma is the type genus of the subfamily Echinosomatinae recorded from Indochina and Malesia. The Dermaptera Species File lists:

1. Echinosoma bifurcatus (Liu, Zhou & Bi, 2010)
2. Echinosoma affine Hincks, 1959
3. Echinosoma afrum (Palisot de Beauvois, 1805) - type species
4. Echinosoma atrum Steinmann, 1983
5. Echinosoma beccarii Srivastava, 1983
6. Echinosoma bolivari Rodzianko, 1897
7. Echinosoma burri Hincks, 1959
8. Echinosoma celebense Hincks, 1959
9. Echinosoma concolor Borelli, 1907
10. Echinosoma congolense Borelli, 1907
11. Echinosoma convolutum Hincks, 1959
12. Echinosoma denticulatum Hincks, 1959
13. Echinosoma excisum Bey-Bienko, 1970
14. Echinosoma forbesi Kirby, 1891
15. Echinosoma formosanum Hincks, 1959
16. Echinosoma forsitan Steinmann, 1986
17. Echinosoma fuscum Borelli, 1907
18. Echinosoma garoense Biswas, Lahiri & Ghosh, 1974
19. Echinosoma grossum Brindle, 1973
20. Echinosoma hebardi Hincks, 1957
21. Echinosoma horridum Dohrn, 1862
22. Echinosoma insulanum Karsch, 1885
23. Echinosoma komodense Bey-Bienko, 1970
24. Echinosoma micropteryx Günther, 1929
25. Echinosoma occidentale de Bormans, 1893
26. Echinosoma pallidicolle Hincks, 1959
27. Echinosoma parvulum Dohrn, 1862
28. Echinosoma philippinense Hincks, 1959
29. Echinosoma roseiventre Kamimura & Nishikawa, 2016
30. Echinosoma rufomarginatum Borelli, 1931
31. Echinosoma sarawacense Hincks, 1959
32. Echinosoma setulosum Hincks, 1959
33. Echinosoma sumatranum (Haan, 1842)
34. Echinosoma tigrina Brindle, 1967
35. Echinosoma trilineatum Borelli, 1921
36. Echinosoma wahlbergi Dohrn, 1862
37. Echinosoma yorkense Dohrn, 1869

=== Genus Parapsalis ===
Authority: Borelli, 1921

1. Parapsalis infernalis (Burr, 1913)
2. Parapsalis laevis Borelli, 1921 - type species
