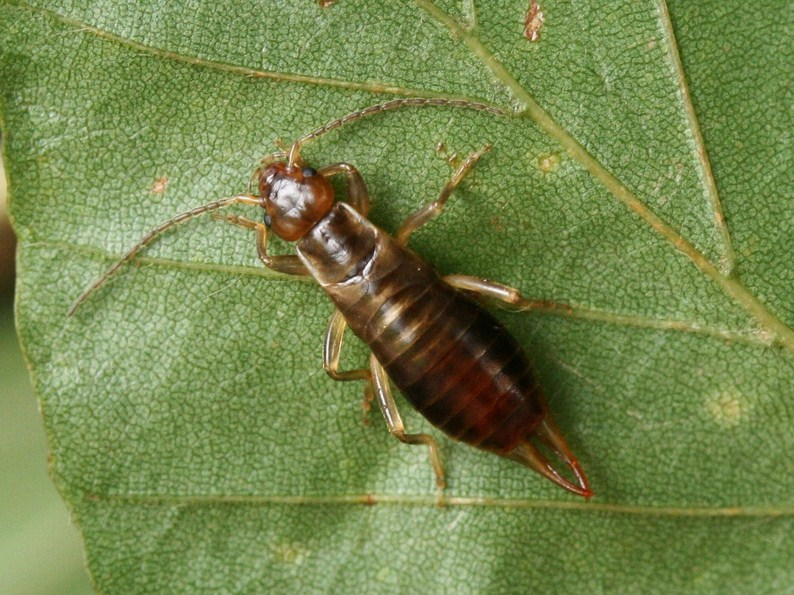
- Chelidurella acanthopygia
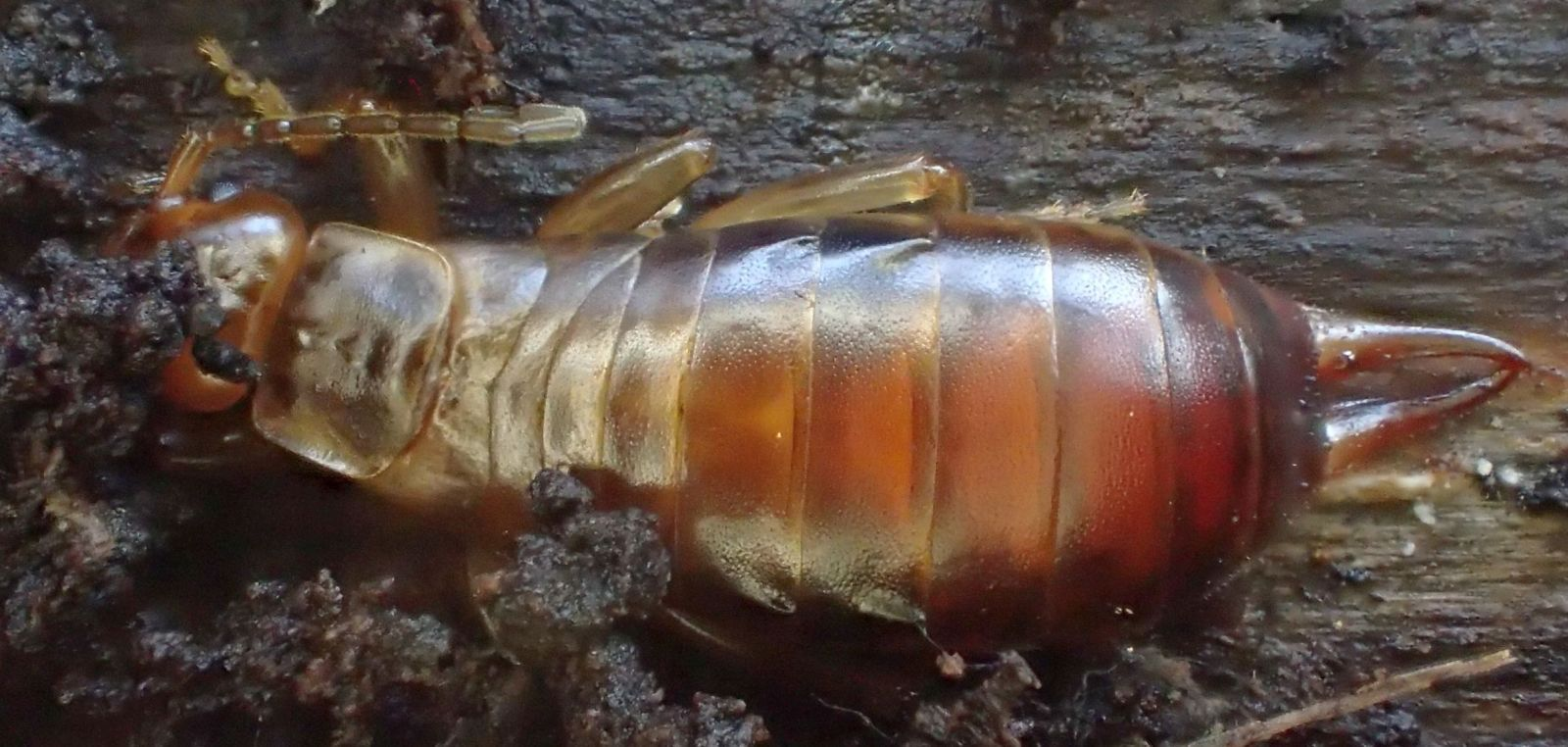
- Chelidurella acanthopygia

Scientific classification
- Kingdom: Animalia
- Phylum: Arthropoda
- Class: Insecta
- Order: Dermaptera
- Family: Forficulidae
- Subfamily: Anechurinae
- Genus: Chelidurella; Verhoeff, 1902

= Chelidurella =

Genus of earwigs

Chelidurella is a genus of European earwigs that belongs to the subfamily Anechurinae. They are flightless.

This genus erected by Karl Wilhelm Verhoeff in 1902. The genus name was recently restored (in 2021: several species had been placed in Chelidura) by Kirstová et al., who provide a key for identification of males.

== Distribution ==
The recorded distribution of species, which is possibly incomplete, is mostly in Northern Europe including Britain. A majority of members are restricted to high-altitude habitats with most species showing narrow endemic distributions in the Alps.

== Species ==
Thin genus shows a significant amount of taxonomic uncertainty. This has led to new species being described based on subtle combinations of variable features on the pygidium and forceps which vary and overlap between species. In addition, growing evidence from molecular phylogenetic studies shows that this genus diversity may have been underestimated. This was shown with the discovery of cryptic species such as C. pseudovignai and C. maccagnoae.

This combination of flightlessness and restored distribution in the Alps has led to this genus having a low dispersal ability. This make Chelidurella particularly susceptible to such geographic isolation which can potentially lead to cryptic speciation in isolated mountain massifs.

Below is a list of species in the genus Chelidurella, there are currently 11 described species:

1. Chelidurella acanthopygia (Géné, 1832) - type species (as Forficula acanthopygia Géné)
2. Chelidurella caprai Vigna Taglianti, 1993
3. Chelidurella fontanai Galvagni, 1996
4. Chelidurella galvagnii Kirstová & Kočárek, 2021
5. Chelidurella maccagnoae Kočárek & Fontana, 2026
6. Chelidurella mutica (Krauss, 1886)
7. Chelidurella poggii Capra, 1982
8. Chelidurella pseudovignai Kočárek &
9. Kirstová, 2021
10. Chelidurella thaleri Harz, 1980
11. Chelidurella vignai Galvagni, 1995
