= Ancistrogastrinae =

Scientific classification
- Domain: Eukaryota
- Kingdom: Animalia
- Phylum: Arthropoda
- Class: Insecta
- Order: Dermaptera
- Suborder: Neodermaptera
- Infraorder: Epidermaptera
- Superfamily: Forficuloidea
- Family: Forficulidae
- Subfamily: Ancistrogastrinae; Verhoeff, 1902

Subfamily of earwigs

Ancistrogastrinae is a subfamily of earwigs in the family Forficulidae. There are about 6 genera and more than 30 described species in Ancistrogastrinae.

== Genera ==
These six genera belong to the subfamily Ancistrogastrinae:

- Ancistrogaster Stal, 1855
- Litocosmia Hebard, 1917
- Osteulcus Burr, 1907
- Paracosmia Borelli, 1909
- Praos Burr, 1907
- Sarcinatrix Rehn, 1903
