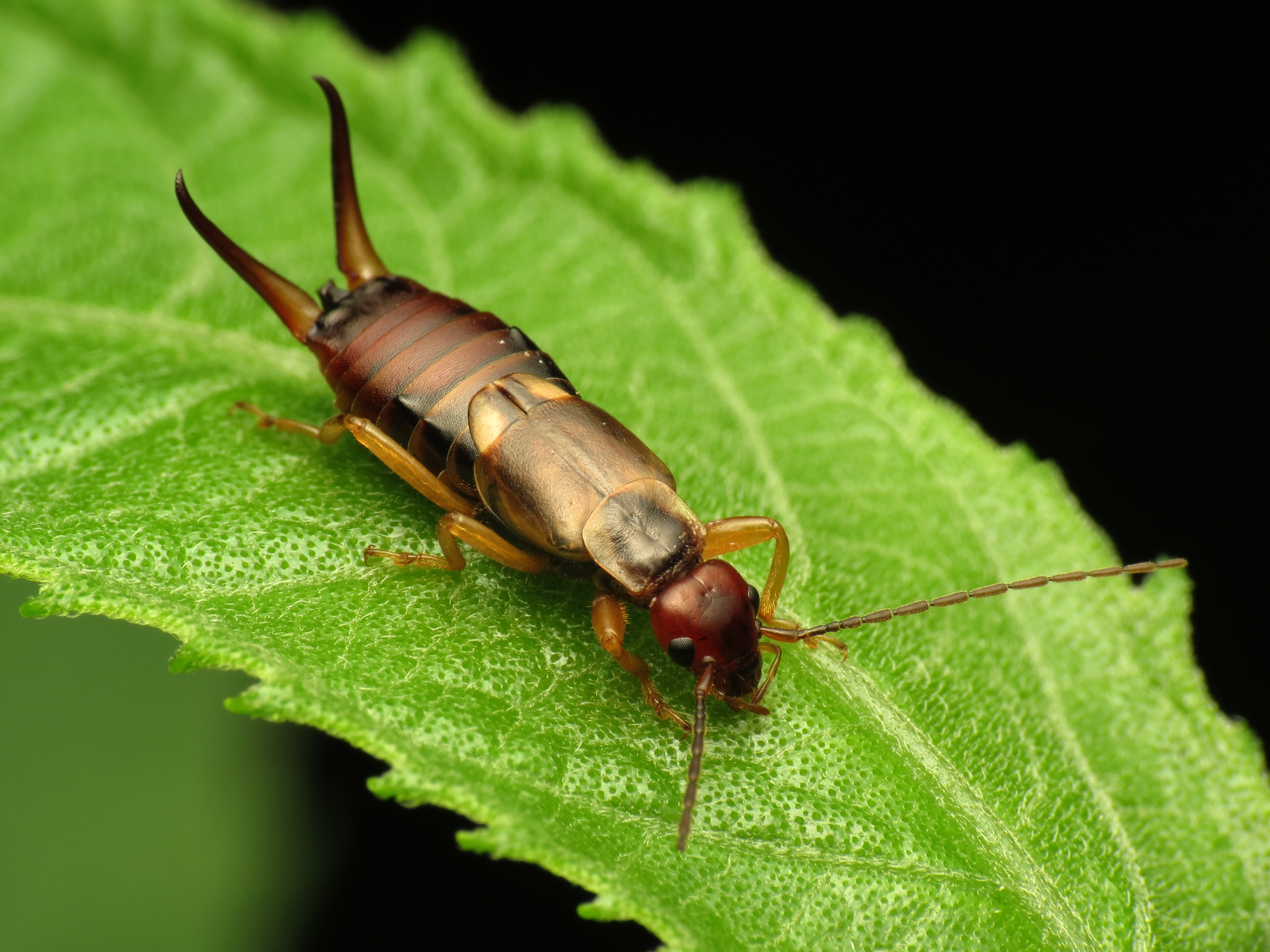
- Forficula auricularia

Scientific classification
- Kingdom: Animalia
- Phylum: Arthropoda
- Class: Insecta
- Order: Dermaptera
- Infraorder: Epidermaptera
- Superfamily: Forficuloidea
- Family: Forficulidae
- Subfamily: Forficulinae; Latreille, 1810

= Forficulinae =

Subfamily of earwigs

Forficulinae is a subfamily of earwigs in the family Forficulidae. There are about 12 genera and more than 160 described species in Forficulinae.

== Genera ==
The subfamily contains the following genera:

- Afroforficula Steinmann, 1993
- Apterygida Westwood, 1840
- Chamaipetes Burr, 1907
- Doru Burr, 1907
- Elaunon Burr, 1907
- Forficula Linnaeus, 1758
- Guanchia Burr, 1911
- Mesolabia Shiraki, 1905
- Parlax Burr, 1911
- Proforficula Steinmann, 1993
- Skalistes Burr, 1907
- Tauropygia Brindle, 1970
