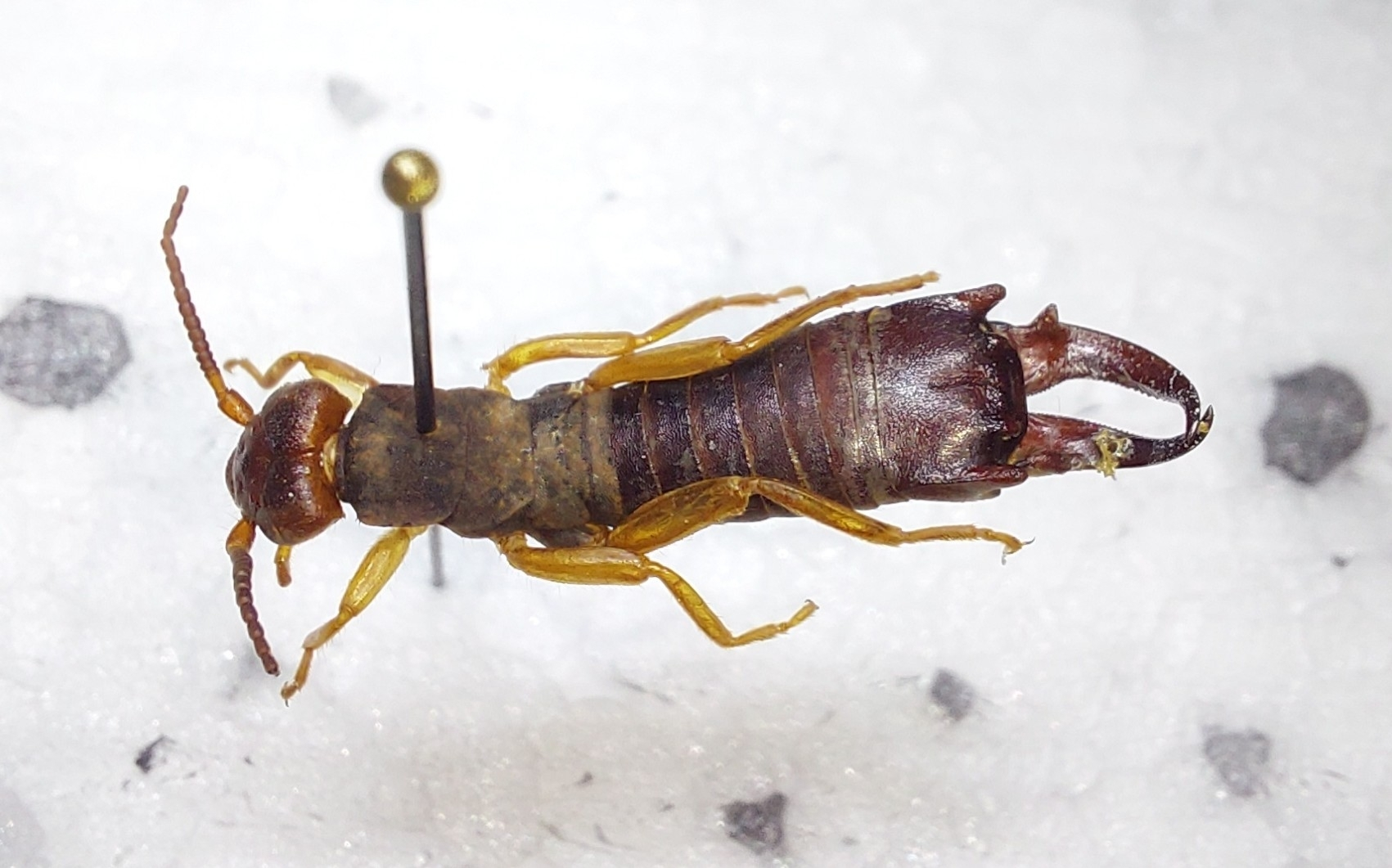
- male of Bormansia africana

Scientific classification
- Kingdom: Animalia
- Phylum: Arthropoda
- Class: Insecta
- Order: Dermaptera
- Infraorder: Protodermaptera
- Superfamily: Pygidicranoidea
- Family: Pygidicranidae; Verhoeff, 1902
- Subfamily: Karschiellinae; Verhoeff, 1902

Genera and species
- See text

= Karschiellinae =

Family of earwigs

Karschiellinae is a subfamily of earwigs in the family Pygidicranidae, which is distributed in Sub-Sahara-Africa, especially in the tropics. The subfamily contains 2 genera and, depending on the scientific view, 11–12 species.

== Genera and species ==
The subfamily includes the following genera and species:

- Bormansia Verhoeff, 1902
1. Bormansia aberrans Hincks, 1959
2. Bormansia africana Verhoeff, 1902
3. Bormansia discendens Hincks, 1959
4. Bormansia impressicollis Verhoeff, 1902
5. Bormansia meridionalis Burr, 1904
6. Bormansia monardi Menozzi, 1937
7. Bormansia proxima Hincks, 1959
8. Bormansia pusilla Brindle, 1978
- Karschiella Verhoeff, 1902
1. Karschiella buettneri (Karsch, 1886)
2. Karschiella camerunensis Verhoeff, 1902
3. Karschiella neavei Burr, 1909
4. Karschiella pygmaea Rehn, 1933

== Characteristics ==
Early nymphal instars of this subfamily have filiform cerci. Adult specimens are easy to recognize by their distinct habitus.
