= Chelidura aptera =

Scientific classification
- Domain: Eukaryota
- Kingdom: Animalia
- Phylum: Arthropoda
- Class: Insecta
- Order: Dermaptera
- Family: Forficulidae
- Genus: Chelidura
- Species: C. aptera

Binomial name
- Chelidura aptera Charpentier, 1825

Synonyms
- Forficula alpina; Forficula montana

Species of earwig

Chelidura aptera is a species of earwig in the family Forficulidae. The distribution is restricted to the southwestern Alps.
