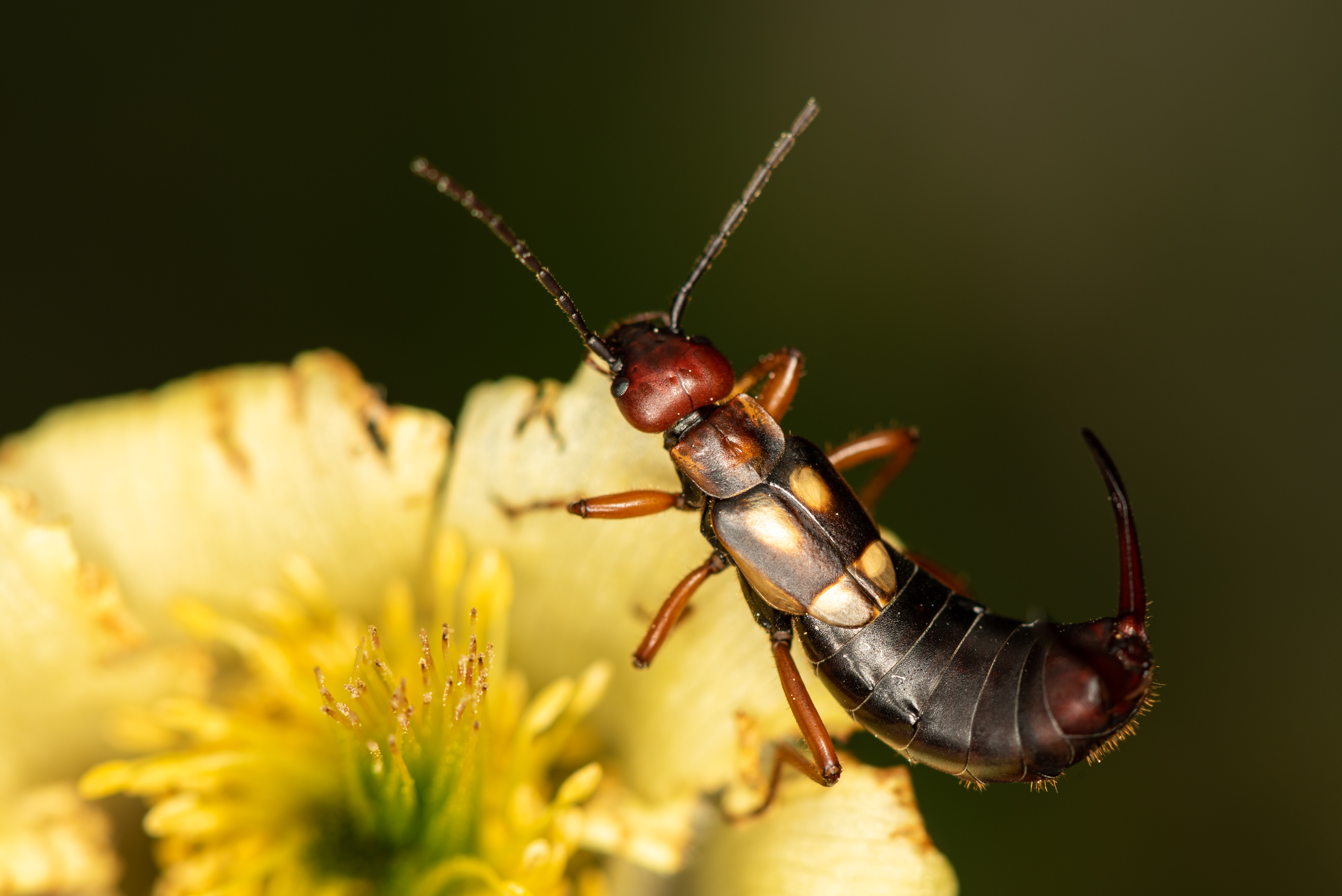
- Anechura bipunctata, imago.

Scientific classification
- Domain: Eukaryota
- Kingdom: Animalia
- Phylum: Arthropoda
- Class: Insecta
- Order: Dermaptera
- Family: Forficulidae
- Genus: Anechura
- Species: A. bipunctata

Binomial name
- Anechura bipunctata (Fabricius, 1781)

Synonyms
- Anechura orientalis Krauss in De Bormans & Krauss, 1900; Chelidura anthracina Kolenati, 1846; Forficula biguttata Fabricius, 1794; Forficula bipunctata Fabricius, 1781; Forficula fabricii Fieber, 1854

= Anechura bipunctata =

Species of earwig

Anechura bipunctata is a species of earwig in the family Forficulidae.

== Distribution ==
This species is present in most of Europe.

== Habitat ==
This montane species can be found at highest elevations, over 2000 meters above sea level.

== Description ==
Anechura bipunctata can reach a length of 12–20 millimetres (0.47–0.79 in) (included cerci). This characteristic winged species shows a black body with a yellow marking on the elytrae. Head, legs and sides of pronotum are yellowish orange. Antennae have 9-12 segments. Pronotum is wider than long. In the males the cerci are double curved. Larvae are black.

== Gallery ==
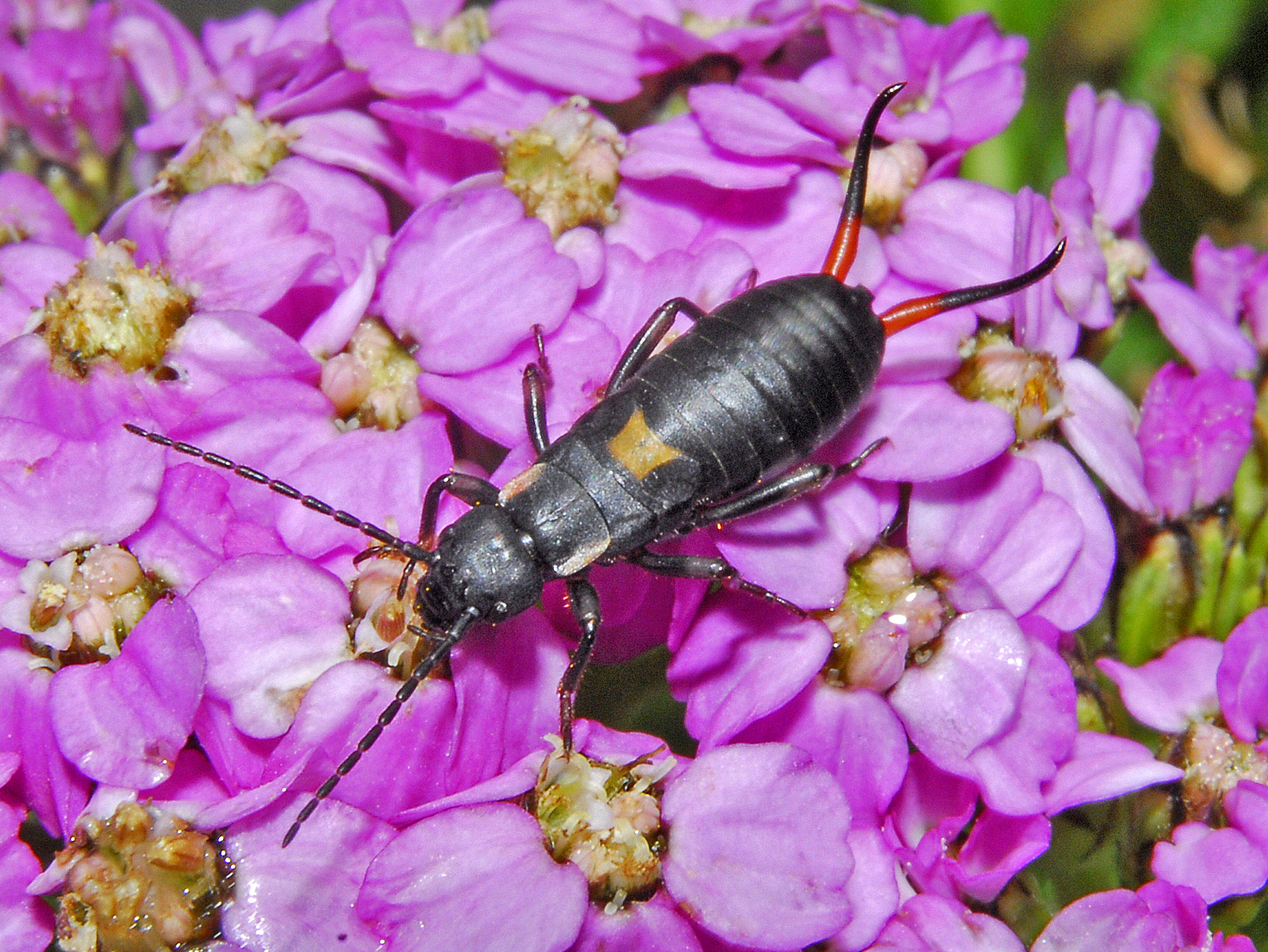

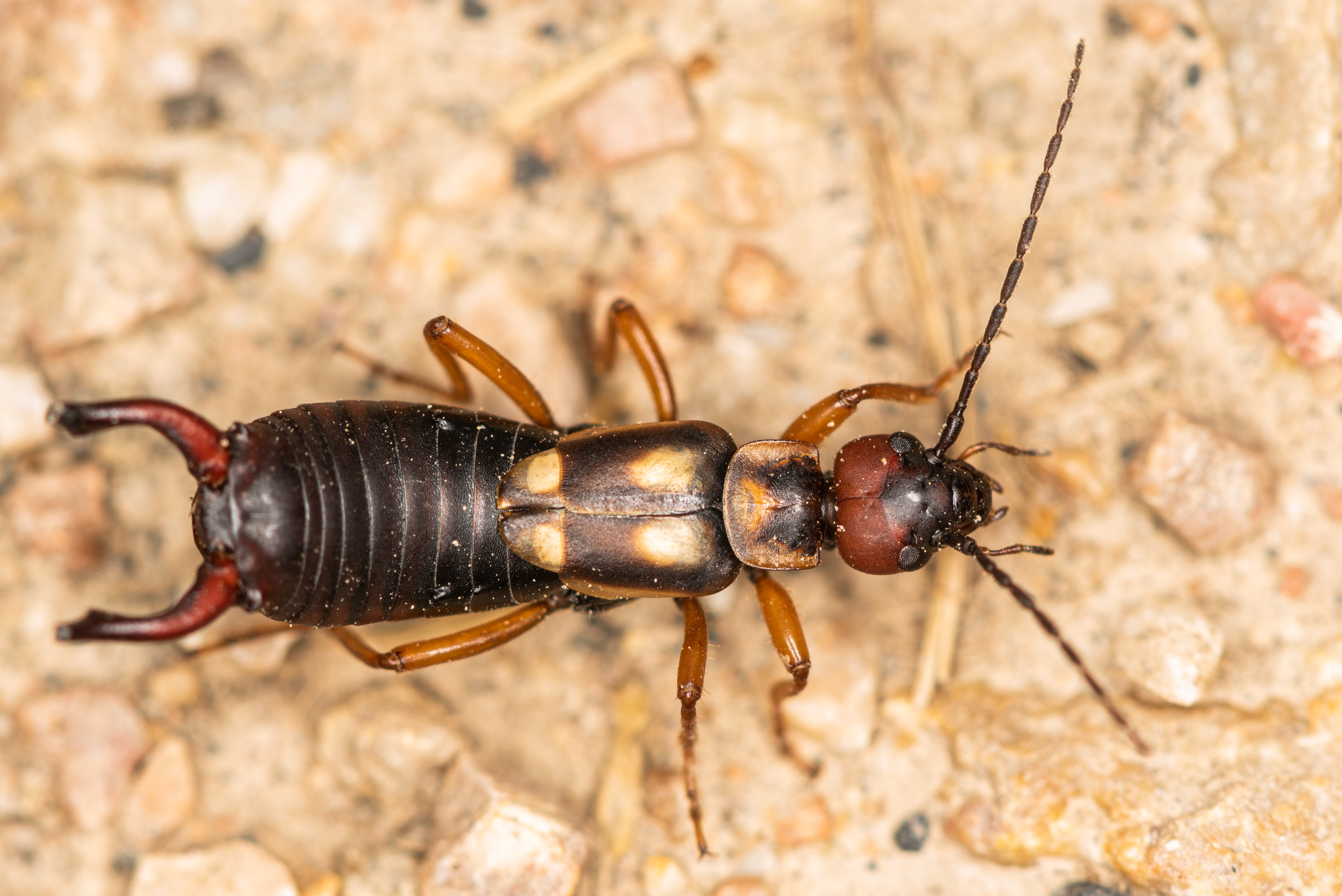

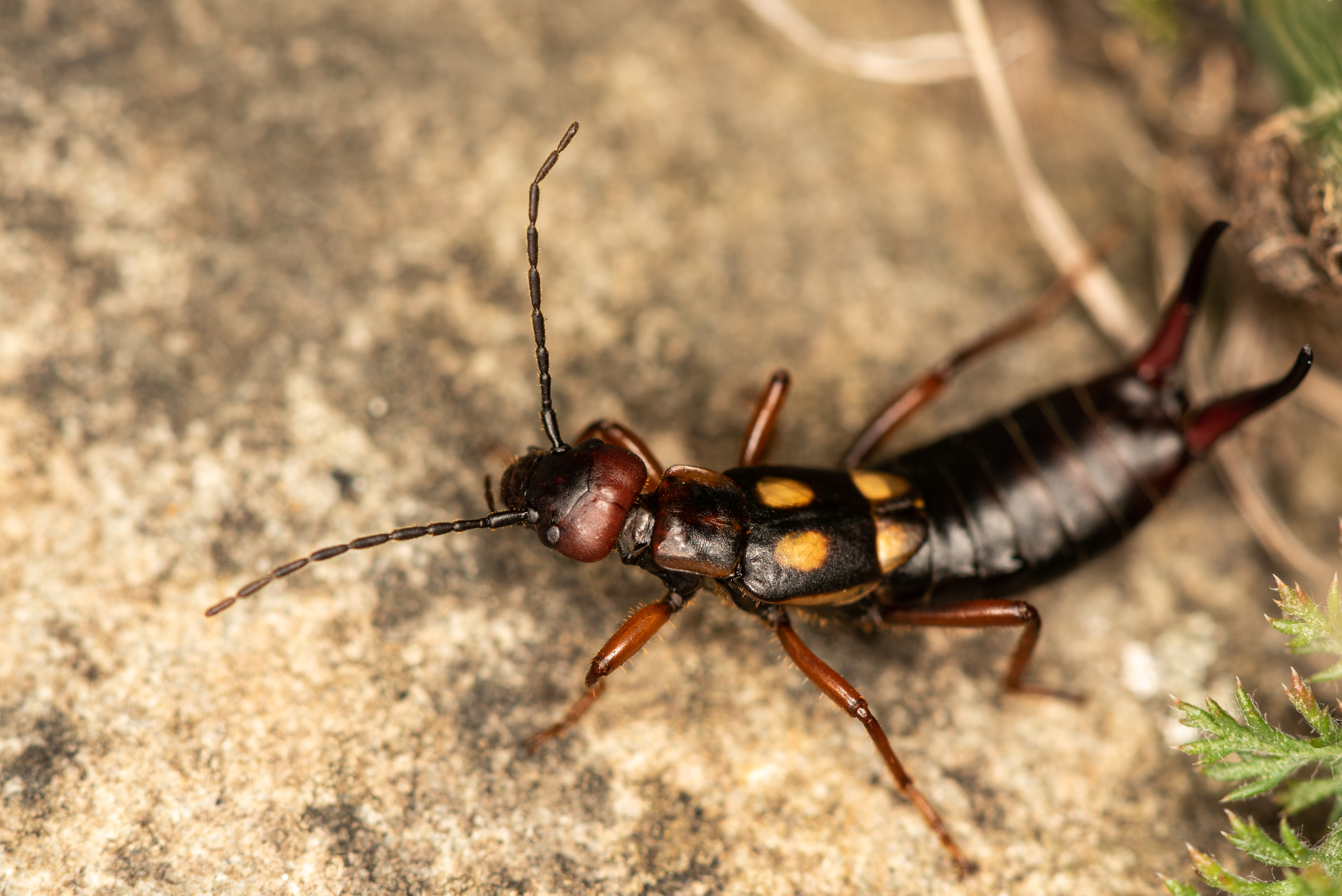

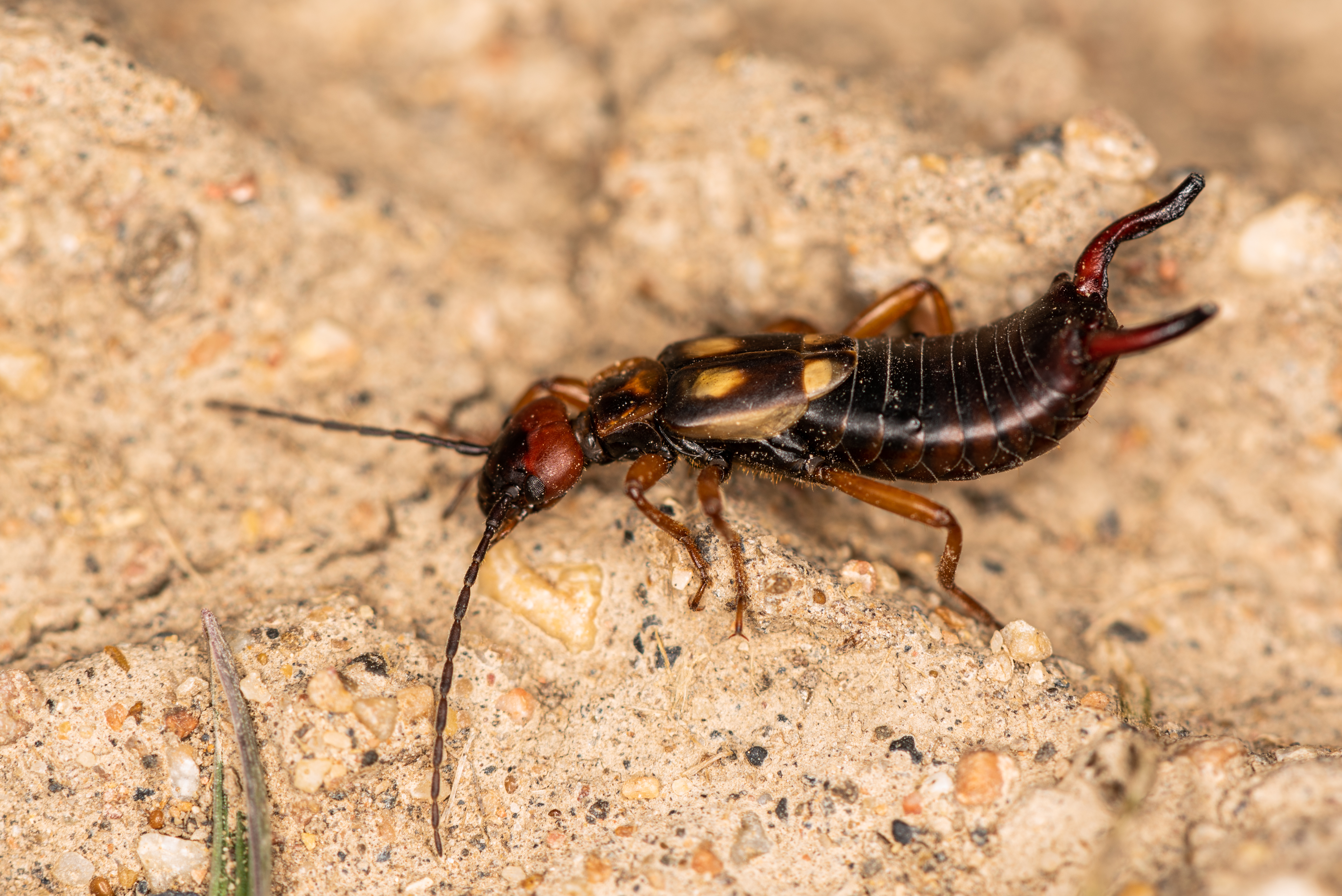

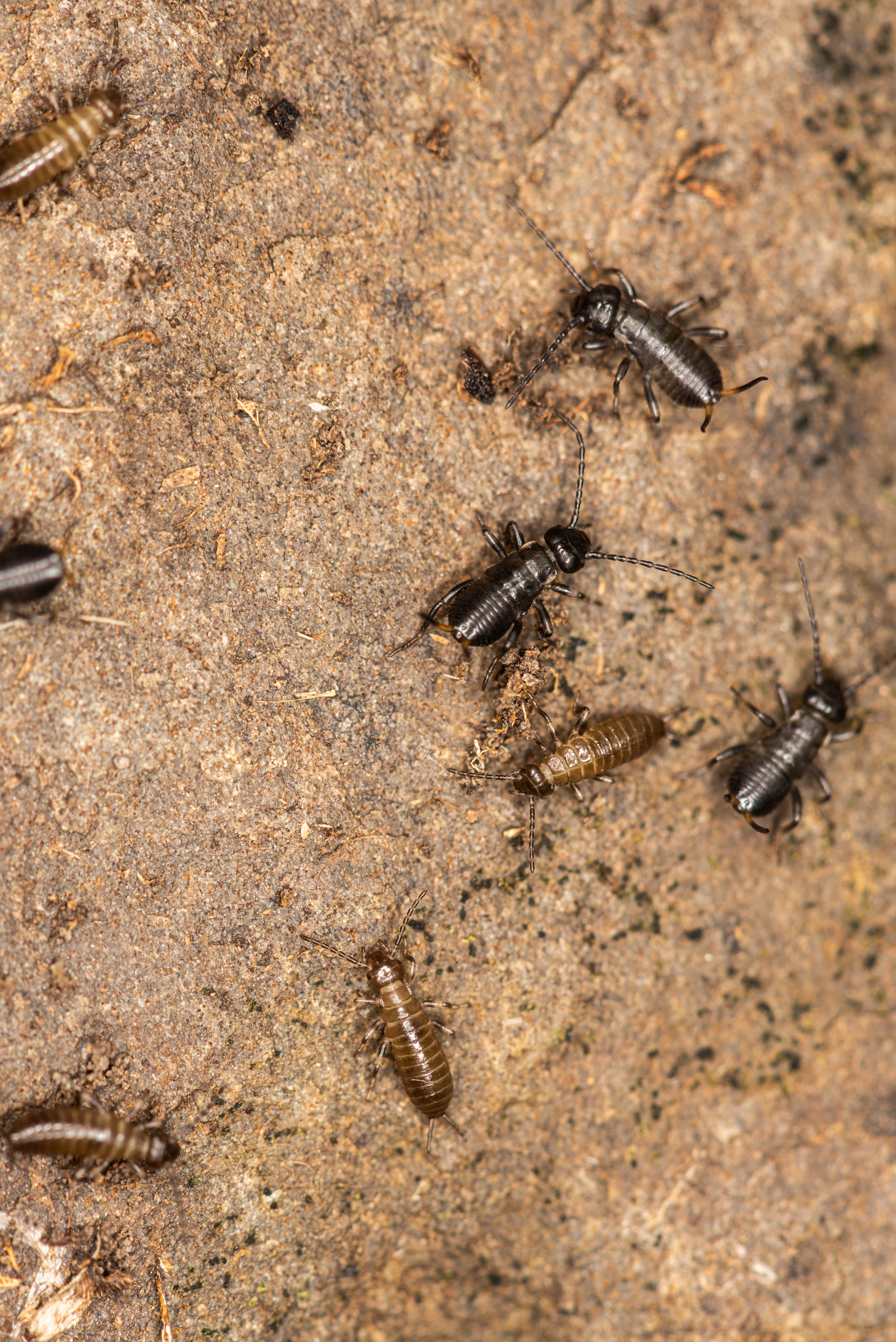
