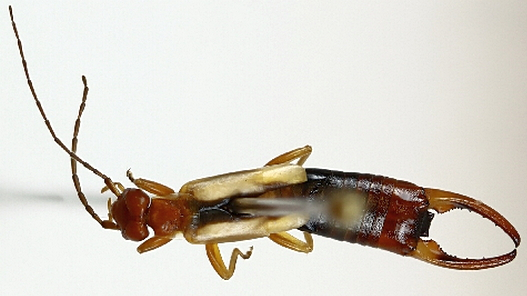
- Diaperasticus erythrocephalus

Scientific classification
- Domain: Eukaryota
- Kingdom: Animalia
- Phylum: Arthropoda
- Class: Insecta
- Order: Dermaptera
- Family: Forficulidae
- Subfamily: Diaperasticinae
- Genus: Diaperasticus; Burr, 1907

= Diaperasticus =

Genus of insects

Diaperasticus is a genus of earwigs in the family Forficulidae. There are about six described species in Diaperasticus.

== Species ==
These six species belong to the genus Diaperasticus:

- Diaperasticus bonchampsi (Burr, 1904)
- Diaperasticus erythrocephalus (Olivier, 1791)
- Diaperasticus krausei Steinmann, 1983
- Diaperasticus sansibaricus (Karsch, 1886)
- Diaperasticus sudanicus Steinmann, 1977
- Diaperasticus wittei Hincks, 1955
