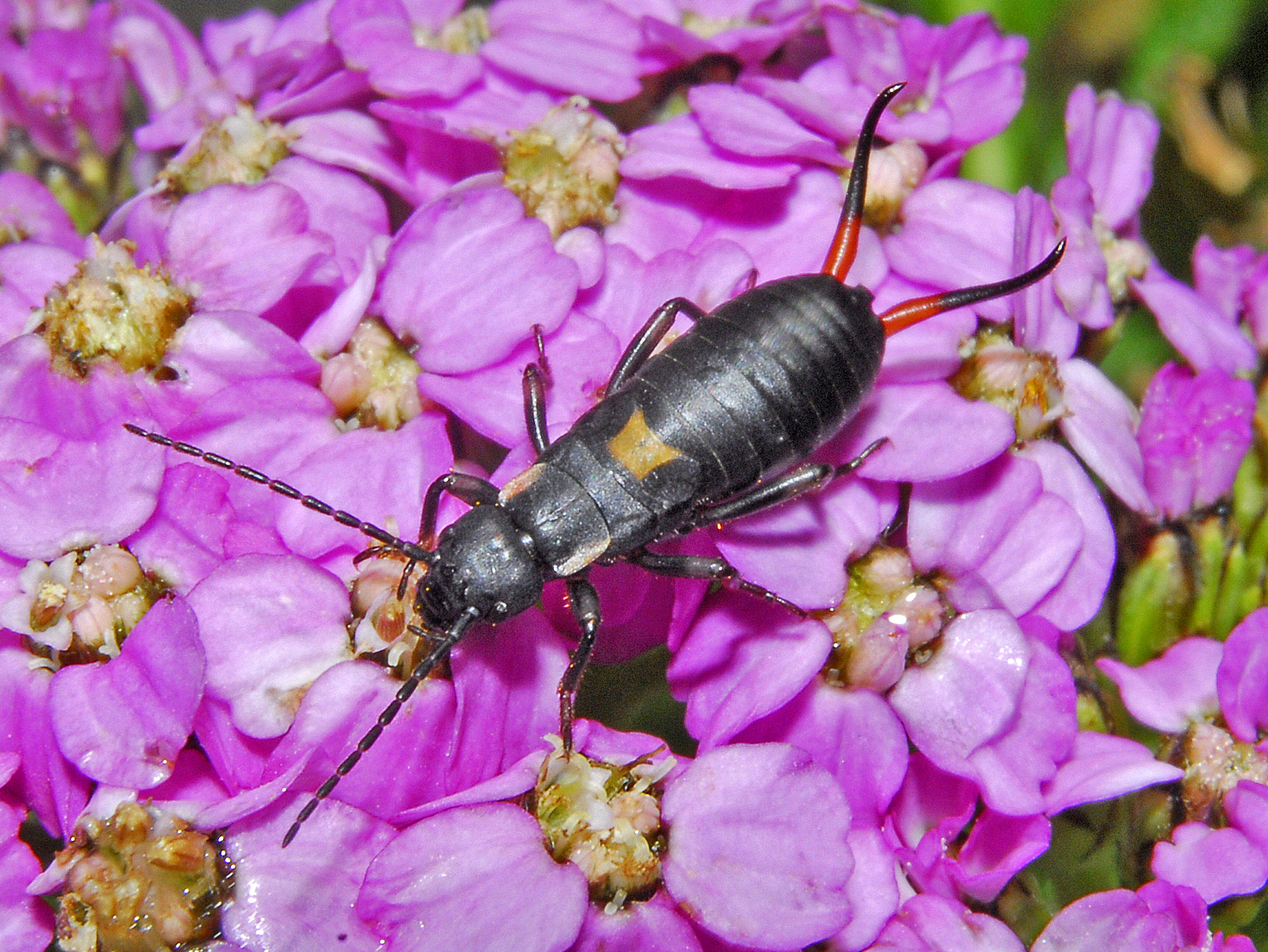
- Anechura bipunctata

Scientific classification
- Domain: Eukaryota
- Kingdom: Animalia
- Phylum: Arthropoda
- Class: Insecta
- Order: Dermaptera
- Family: Forficulidae
- Subfamily: Anechurinae
- Genus: Anechura; Scudder, 1876

Synonyms
- Odontopsalis Burr, 1904; Achenura (misspelling)

= Anechura =

Family of earwigs

Anechura is a family of earwigs in the family Forficulidae.

== Species ==
Species within this genus include:

- Anechura bipunctata (Fabricius, 1781)
- Anechura crinitata (Shiraki, 1905)
- Anechura filchneri (Burr, 1908)
- Anechura forficuliformis Semenov & Bey-Bienko, 1935
- Anechura globalis Steinmann, 1990
- Anechura harmandi (Burr, 1904)
- Anechura japonica (De Bormans, 1880)
- Anechura lewisi (Burr, 1904)
- Anechura lucifer Steinmann, 1985
- Anechura modesta Bey-Bienko, 1959
- Anechura nayyari Kapoor, 1966
- Anechura nigrescens Shiraki, 1936
- Anechura potanini Bey-Bienko, 1934
- Anechura primaria Bey-Bienko, 1959
- Anechura quelparta Okamoto, 1924
- Anechura rubicapitis Liu, 1946
- Anechura senator Steinmann, 1990
- Anechura sokotrana Burr, 1905
- Anechura svenhedini Bey-Bienko, 1933
- Anechura torquata Burr, 1905
- Anechura zubovskii Semenov, 1901
