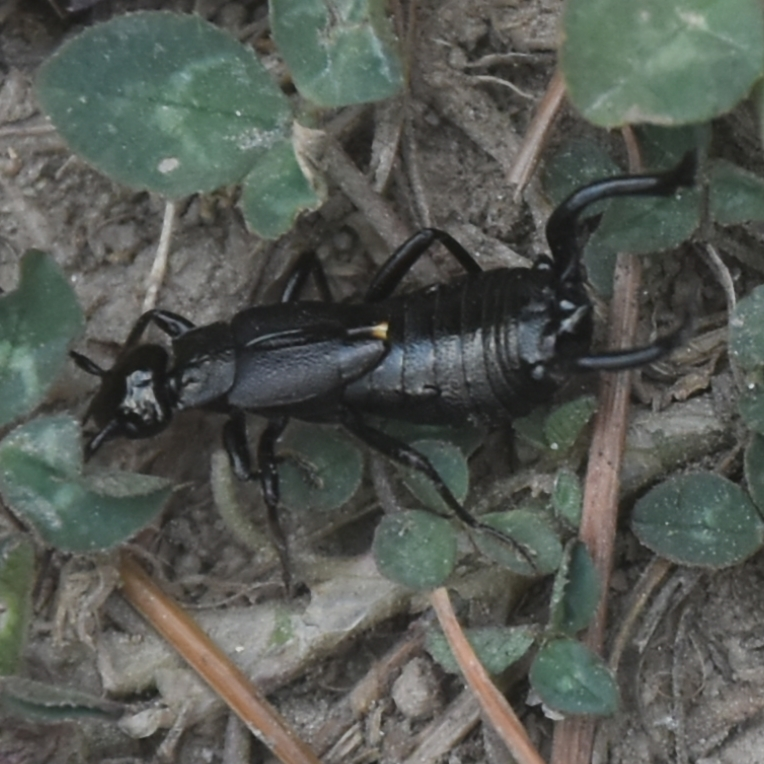
- Allodahlia macropyga

Scientific classification
- Domain: Eukaryota
- Kingdom: Animalia
- Phylum: Arthropoda
- Class: Insecta
- Order: Dermaptera
- Family: Forficulidae
- Subfamily: Allodahliinae
- Genus: Allodahlia; Verhoeff, 1902

Species
- See text

= Allodahlia =

Genus of earwigs

Allodahlia is a genus of Asian earwigs in the family Forficulidae.

== Species ==
The genus contains the following species:

1. Allodahlia ahrimanes (Burr, 1900)
2. Allodahlia ancylura (Dohrn, 1865) (= Allodahlia spinosa Brindle, 1966)
3. Allodahlia bispina Bey-Bienko, 1959
4. Allodahlia coriacea (de Bormans, 1894) (= Allodahlia signata Bey-Bienko, 1970)
5. Allodahlia dineshi Gangola, 1965
6. Allodahlia guptae Kapoor, 1968
7. Allodahlia julkai Srivastava, 1978
8. Allodahlia macropyga (Westwood, 1836) (= Allodahlia huegeli (Dohrn, 1865))
9. Allodahlia martensi Brindle, 1974
10. Allodahlia ochroptera Brindle, 1972
11. Allodahlia oxypyga Bey-Bienko, 1970
12. Allodahlia scabriuscula (Audinet-Serville, 1838)
  type species (as Forficula brachynota Haan, 1842 = Allodahlia brachynota, by subsequent designation)
