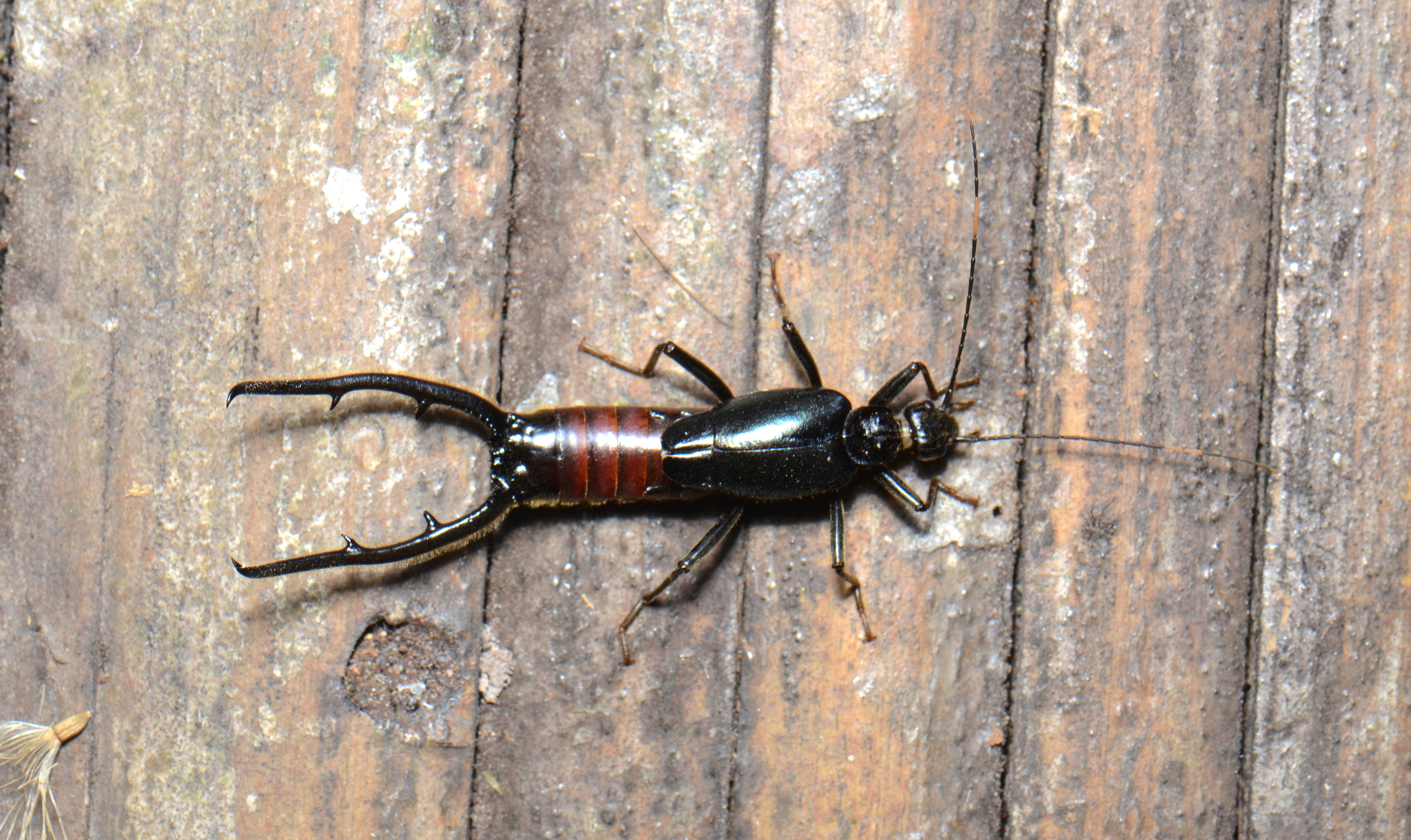
- Opisthocosmia sp. from Borneo

Scientific classification
- Kingdom: Animalia
- Phylum: Arthropoda
- Class: Insecta
- Order: Dermaptera
- Family: Forficulidae
- Subfamily: Opisthocosmiinae
- Genus: Opisthocosmia; Dohrn, 1865

= Opisthocosmia =

Genus of earwigs

Opisthocosmia is a genus of earwigs, typical of the subfamily Opisthocosmiinae, erected by Heinrich Wolfgang Ludwig Dohrn in 1907. Records of occurrence (probably incomplete) include Malesia and South America.

== Species ==
The Global Biodiversity Information Facility includes:

1. Opisthocosmia centurio Dohrn, 1865
2. Opisthocosmia cervipyga Kirby, 1891
3. Opisthocosmia longipes (Haan, 1842)
4. Opisthocosmia silvestris Moreira, 1930
5. Opisthocosmia tenuis Rehn, 1936
6. Opisthocosmia vigilans (Stal, 1855)
