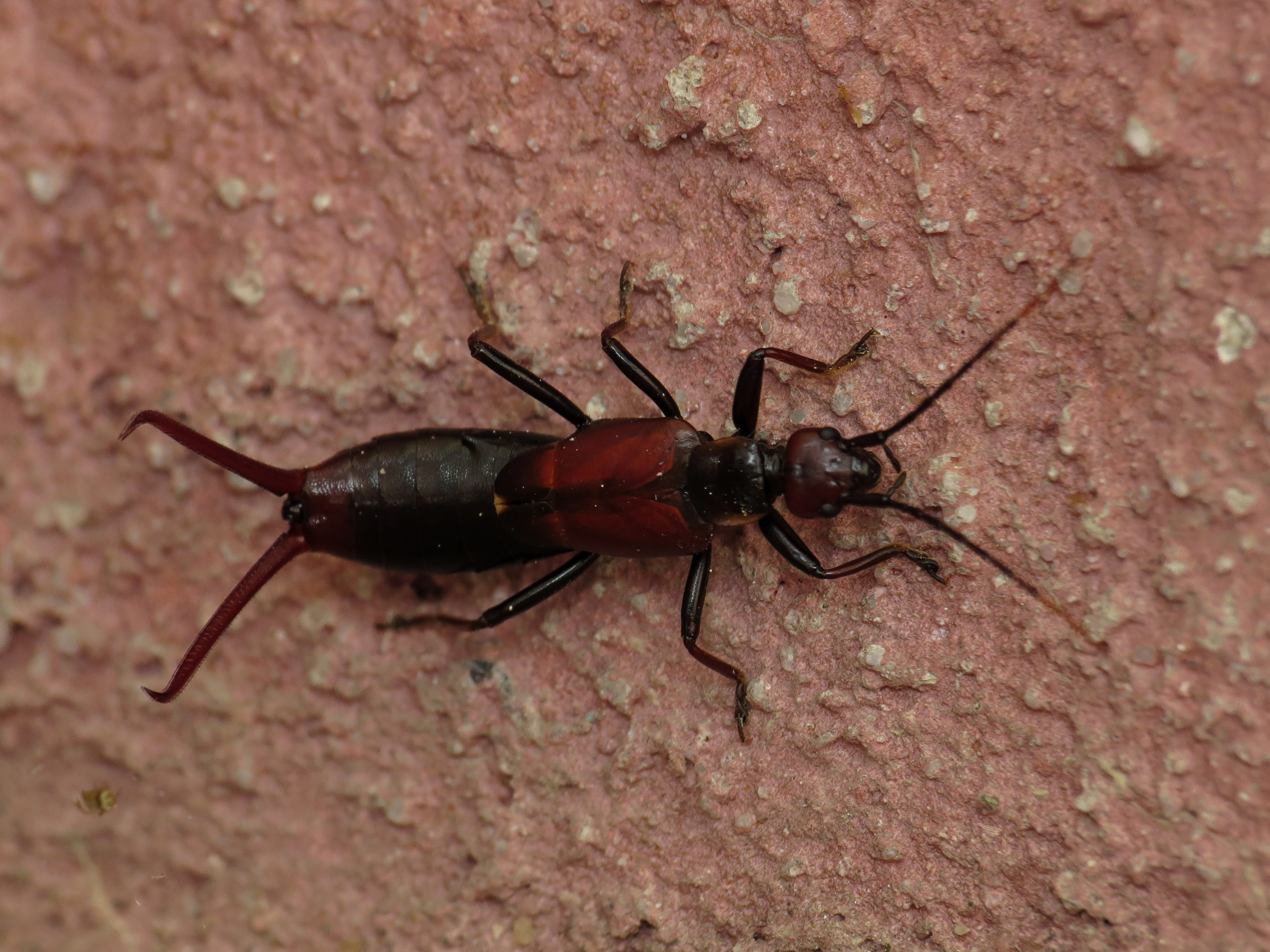

Scientific classification
- Domain: Eukaryota
- Kingdom: Animalia
- Phylum: Arthropoda
- Class: Insecta
- Order: Dermaptera
- Family: Forficulidae
- Genus: Timomenus
- Species: T. komarowi

Binomial name
- Timomenus komarowi (Semenov, 1901)

Synonyms
- Opisthocosmia komarowi Semenov, 1901; Apterygida femorata Matsumura, 1913

= Timomenus komarowi =

Species of earwig

Timomenus komarowi, is a species of earwig in the family Forficulidae. In several publications, the species name was miswritten as Timomenus komarovi in several later publications, which per ICZN 33.3, is an incorrect subsequent spelling. An argument could be made for prevailing usage, but Storozhenko & Paik, 2009 instead advocated for adoption of the original spelling.

== Description ==
Males of T. komarowi are 24.5–26.5 mm long with forceps 10.0–11.5 mm long. Females are 15.0–17.0 mm with forceps 5.5–7.5 mm.

== Range ==
This species is found in Asia.

== Locomotion ==
The methods by which T. komarowi moves on both rough and smooth surfaces have been investigated using scanning electron microscopy. It attaches to rough surfaces using the pretarsal claws on its legs, and attaches to smooth surfaces using two groups of hairy tarsal pads.
