= Forficulites =

Forficulites Temporal range: 28.4–23.03 Ma

Scientific classification
- Domain: Eukaryota
- Kingdom: Animalia
- Phylum: Arthropoda
- Class: Insecta
- Order: Dermaptera
- Family: Forficulidae
- Genus: †Forficulites; Statz, 1939
- Species: †F. rottensis

Binomial name
- †Forficulites rottensis Statz, 1939

Extinct genus of earwigs

Forficulites is an extinct genus of earwigs within the family Forficulidae containing a single species, Forficulites rottensis, that lived during the Oligocene epoch. It was described by Georg Statz in 1939, from the Rott Formation in Germany.
