= Liparura =

Scientific classification
- Domain: Eukaryota
- Kingdom: Animalia
- Phylum: Arthropoda
- Class: Insecta
- Order: Dermaptera
- Family: Forficulidae
- Subfamily: Skendylinae
- Genus: Liparura; Burr, 1907

Genus of earwigs

Liparura is a genus of earwigs within the family Forficulidae.

== Species ==
- Liparura charlottea Matzke, 2012
- Liparura chongqingensis Ye, Kamimura, Li & Liu, 2023
- Liparura debrepaniensis (Kapoor, Bharadwaj & Banerjee, 1971)
- Liparura dentata Srivastava 1977
- Liparura kamengensis Srivastava 1977
- Liparura montuosa Steinmann 1983
- Liparura punctata Burr 1910
- Liparura serrata Srivastava 1977
- Liparura simplex Brindle 1975
- Liparura sinensis Chen & Chen, 1935
- Liparura tegminata Steinmann 1983
