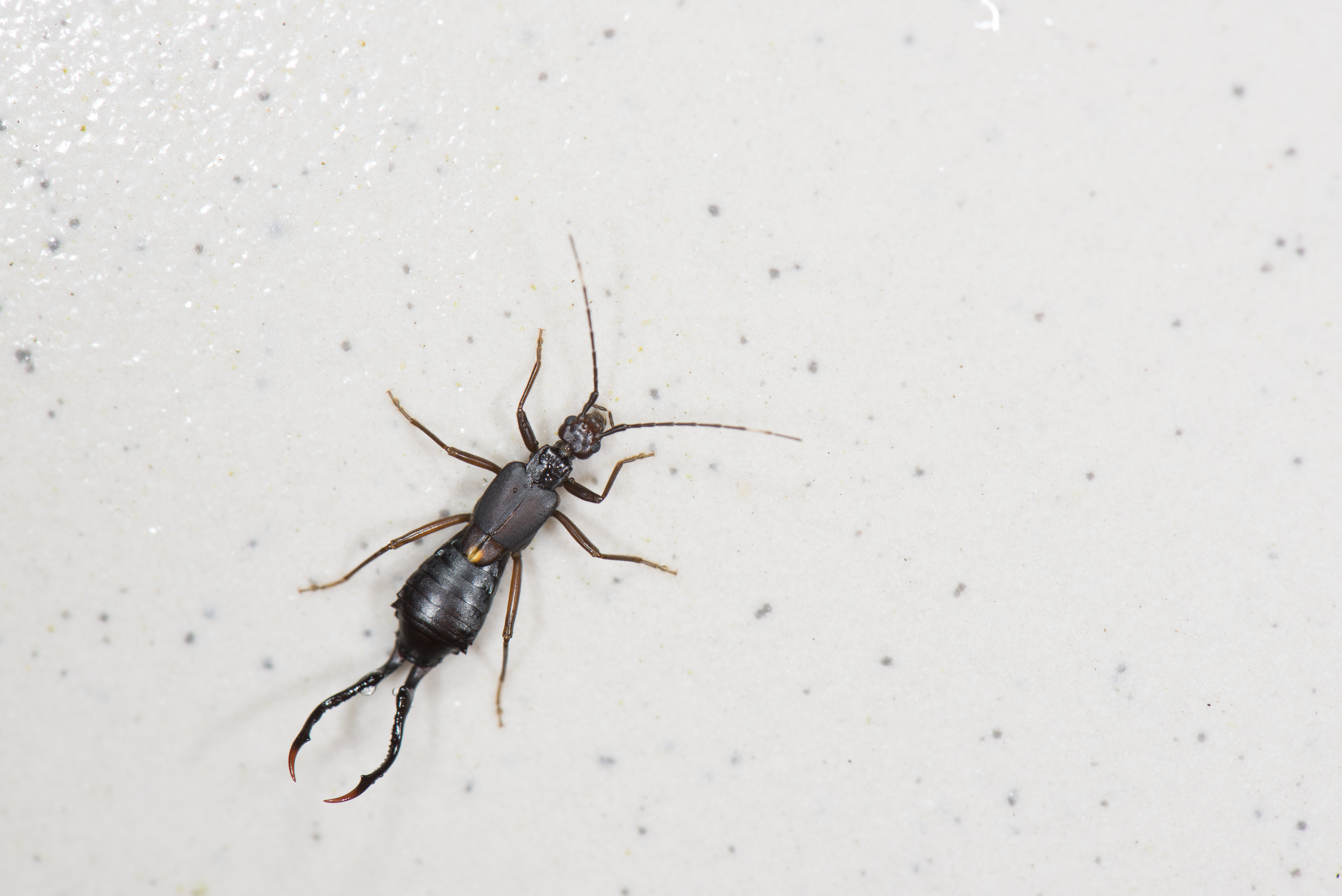
- Eparchus sp.

Scientific classification
- Kingdom: Animalia
- Phylum: Arthropoda
- Class: Insecta
- Order: Dermaptera
- Family: Forficulidae
- Subfamily: Opisthocosmiinae
- Genus: Eparchus; Burr, 1907

Synonyms
- Taipinia Shiraki, 1908

= Eparchus =

Genus of earwigs

Eparchus is a genus of Asian earwigs, in the subfamily Opisthocosmiinae, erected by Malcolm Burr in 1907.

== Species ==
The Global Biodiversity Information Facility includes:

1. Eparchus beccarii (de Bormans, 1900)
2. Eparchus biroi (Burr, 1902)
3. Eparchus burri (de Bormans, 1903)
4. Eparchus cruentatus Burr, 1909
5. Eparchus dux (de Bormans, 1894)
6. Eparchus forcipatus (Haan, 1842)
7. Eparchus globus Steinmann, 1990
8. Eparchus insignis (Haan, 1842)
9. Eparchus mercator Steinmann, 1983
10. Eparchus mindanensis Günther, 1934
11. Eparchus pullus (Shiraki, 1908)
12. Eparchus simplex (de Bormans, 1894)
13. Eparchus subflava Steinmann, 1983
14. Eparchus tenellus (Haan, 1842)
15. Eparchus tuberculatus (Borelli, 1921)
16. Eparchus yezoensis (Shiraki, 1905)
