= Obelura =

Scientific classification
- Domain: Eukaryota
- Kingdom: Animalia
- Phylum: Arthropoda
- Class: Insecta
- Order: Dermaptera
- Family: Forficulidae
- Subfamily: Skendylinae
- Genus: Obelura; Burr, 1907

Genus of insects

Obelura is a genus of earwigs belonging to the family Forficulidae.

Species:

- Obelura asiatica (de Bormans, 1897)
- Obelura tamul (Burr, 1901)
