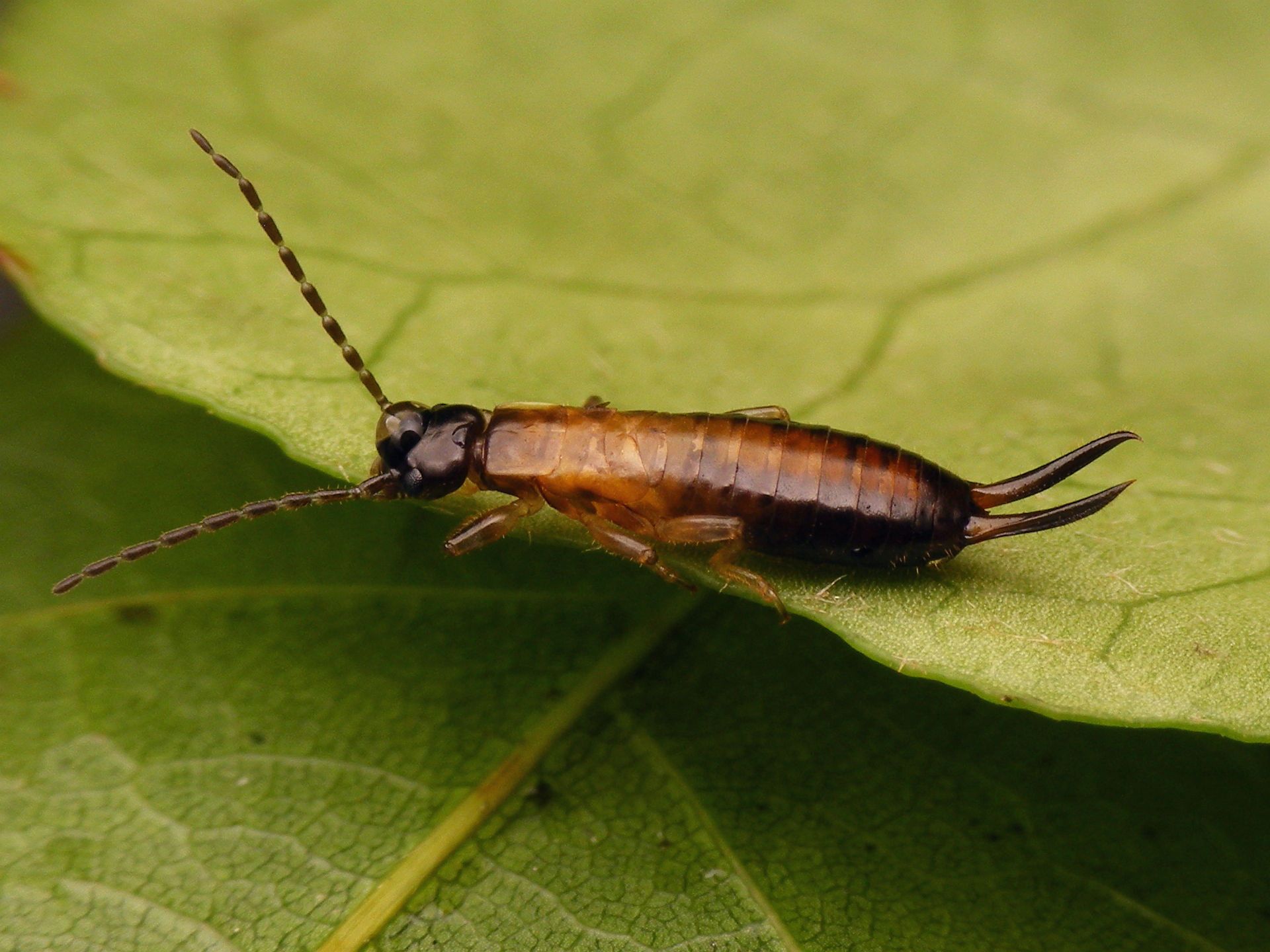
- Guanchia

Scientific classification
- Domain: Eukaryota
- Kingdom: Animalia
- Phylum: Arthropoda
- Class: Insecta
- Order: Dermaptera
- Family: Forficulidae
- Subfamily: Forficulinae
- Genus: Guanchia; Burr, 1911

= Guanchia =

Genus of earwigs

Guanchia is a genus of earwigs in the family Forficulidae. There are more than 30 described species in Guanchia.

== Species ==
These 34 species belong to the genus Guanchia:

- Guanchia bandamaensis Martin, 1978
- Guanchia bicarinata Hincks, 1947
- Guanchia biturberculata (Brindle, 1966)
- Guanchia brevitarsis (Chopard, 1942)
- Guanchia brignolii (Taglianti, 1974)
- Guanchia cabrerae (Bolivar, 1893)
- Guanchia canariensis (Burr, 1905)
- Guanchia chirurga Burr, 1911
- Guanchia circinata (Finot, 1893)
- Guanchia crassa (Brindle, 1978)
- Guanchia distendens (Brindle, 1975)
- Guanchia fernandezi Martin, 1978
- Guanchia gomerensis Martin, 1978
- Guanchia guancharia (Heller, 1907)
- Guanchia hincksi (Burr, 1947)
- Guanchia kaznakovi (Semenov, 1908)
- Guanchia lucens (Brindle, 1975)
- Guanchia medica Burr, 1911
- Guanchia obtusangula (Krauss, 1904)
- Guanchia palmensis Baez, 1986
- Guanchia pubescens (Géné, 1837)
- Guanchia rehni (Burr, 1952)
- Guanchia rugosula (Hincks, 1957)
- Guanchia schmitzi (Borelli, 1906)
- Guanchia sjoestedti (Burr, 1907)
- Guanchia sokotrana (Burr, 1905)
- Guanchia storai Chopard, 1942
- Guanchia storåi Chopard, 1942
- Guanchia taylori (Popham, 1983)
- Guanchia tenerifensis Martin, 1978
- Guanchia transversa Brindle, 1968
- Guanchia triangulata (Hincks, 1950)
- Guanchia uvarovi (Semenov Tian-Shansky & Bey-Bienko, 1935)
- Guanchia uxoris (Heller, 1907)
