= Allodahliinae =

Scientific classification
- Domain: Eukaryota
- Kingdom: Animalia
- Phylum: Arthropoda
- Class: Insecta
- Order: Dermaptera
- Family: Forficulidae
- Subfamily: Allodahliinae; Verhoeff, 1902

Genera
- See text

Subfamily of earwigs

Allodahliinae is a subfamily of earwigs in the family Forficulidae. There are at least 3 genera and about 16 described species in Allodahliinae.

== Genera ==
These three genera belong to the subfamily Allodahliinae:

- Allodahlia Verhoeff, 1902
- Brindleiana Steinmann, 1975
- Eulithinus Hincks, 1935
