= Skendylinae =

Scientific classification
- Domain: Eukaryota
- Kingdom: Animalia
- Phylum: Arthropoda
- Class: Insecta
- Order: Dermaptera
- Suborder: Neodermaptera
- Infraorder: Epidermaptera
- Superfamily: Forficuloidea
- Family: Forficulidae
- Subfamily: Skendylinae; Burr, 1907

Subfamily of earwigs

Skendylinae is a subfamily of earwigs in the family Forficulidae. There are about 12 genera and more than 60 described species in Skendylinae.

== Genera ==
These 12 genera belong to the subfamily Skendylinae:

- Afrocosmia Hincks, 1960
- Brachycosmiella Steinmann, 1990
- Cosmiella Verhoeff, 1902
- Cosmiola Bey-Bienko, 1959
- Forcepsia Moreira, 1930
- Kleter Burr, 1907
- Liparura Burr, 1907
- Lipodes Burr, 1907
- Mixocosmia Borelli, 1909
- Neocosmiella Hebard, 1919
- Obelura Burr, 1907
- Paracosmiella Steinmann, 1990
