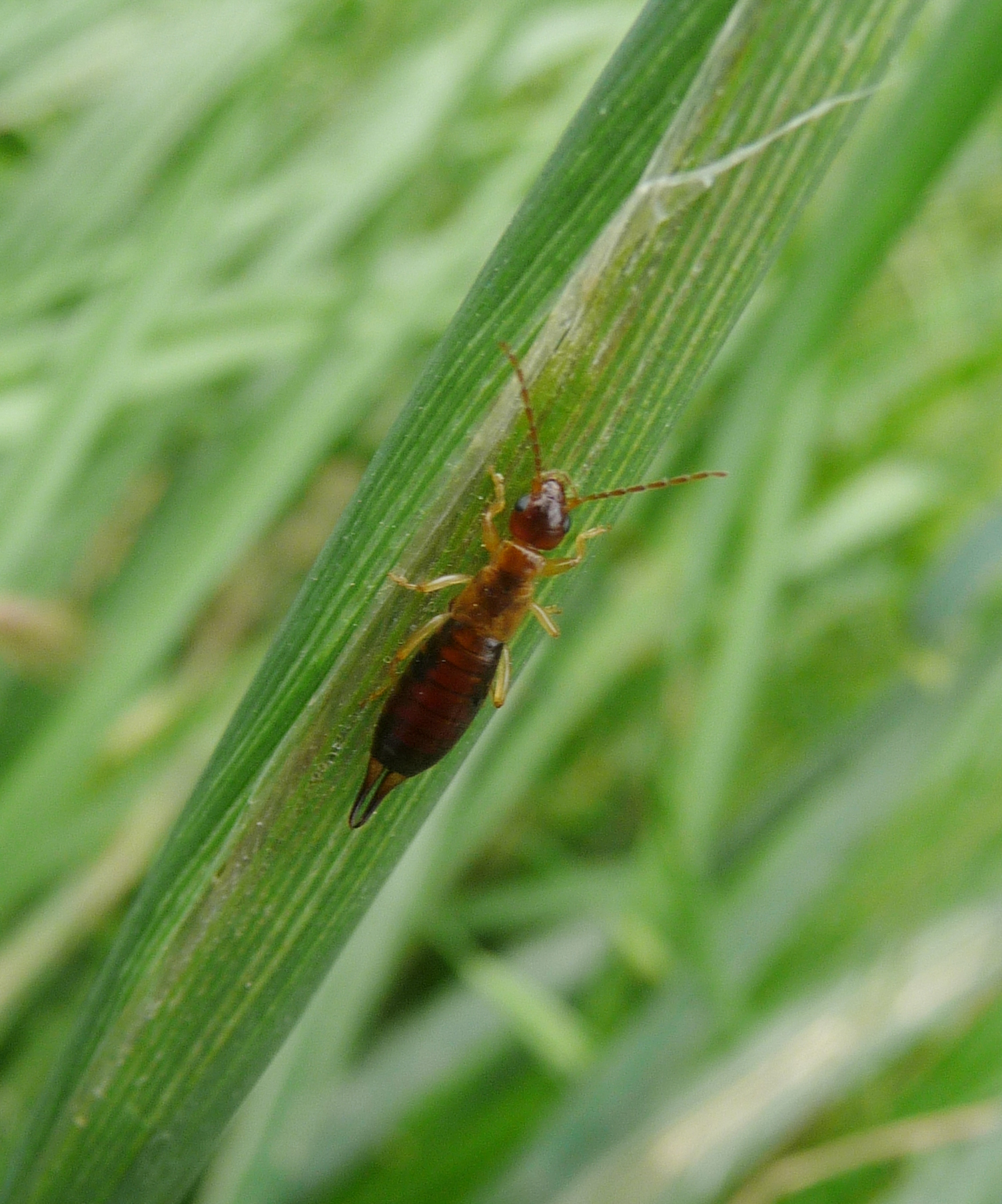

Scientific classification
- Domain: Eukaryota
- Kingdom: Animalia
- Phylum: Arthropoda
- Class: Insecta
- Order: Dermaptera
- Family: Forficulidae
- Genus: Apterygida
- Species: A. media

Binomial name
- Apterygida media (Hagenbach, 1822)

Synonyms
- Forficula media Hagenbach, 1822; Apterygida albipennis Megerle, 1825; Forficula curta Fischer, 1846; Forficula freyi Dohrn, 1859; Apterygida pedestris Westwood, 1840

= Apterygida media =

Species of earwig

Apterygida media is a species of European earwig, known as the short-winged earwig or hop-garden earwig.

== Distribution ==
The distribution of A. media ranges from southern Sweden in the north to Greece in the south, and from Portugal in the west to Ukraine in the east. It is one of only four native species of earwig in the United Kingdom, although three further species have been introduced. In the United Kingdom, it is only found in the south-east, which has the most continental climate. It is widespread in East Kent, and is also found in Essex and Suffolk. It may have arrived in Great Britain via a land bridge over the North Sea known as Doggerland.

== Taxonomy ==
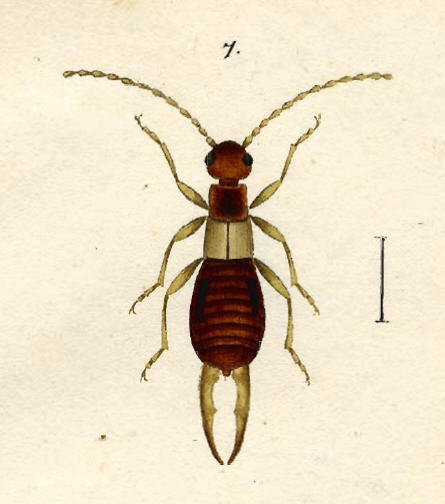
Hagenbach's 1822 illustration of "Forficula media" (now Apterygida media)

Apterygida media was first described by Jacob Johann Hagenbach under the name Forficula media. His description appeared in the 1822 work Insectorum Helvetiae.

== Description ==
Apterygida media has short wings and elytra. It is redidsh-brown in colour, with yellow legs.

== Ecology ==
Apterygida media is thought to have been a common insect in the hop gardens of Kent until the introduction of pesticides. It is now found chiefly in warm hedges and woodland edges, particularly on field maples (Acer campestre).
