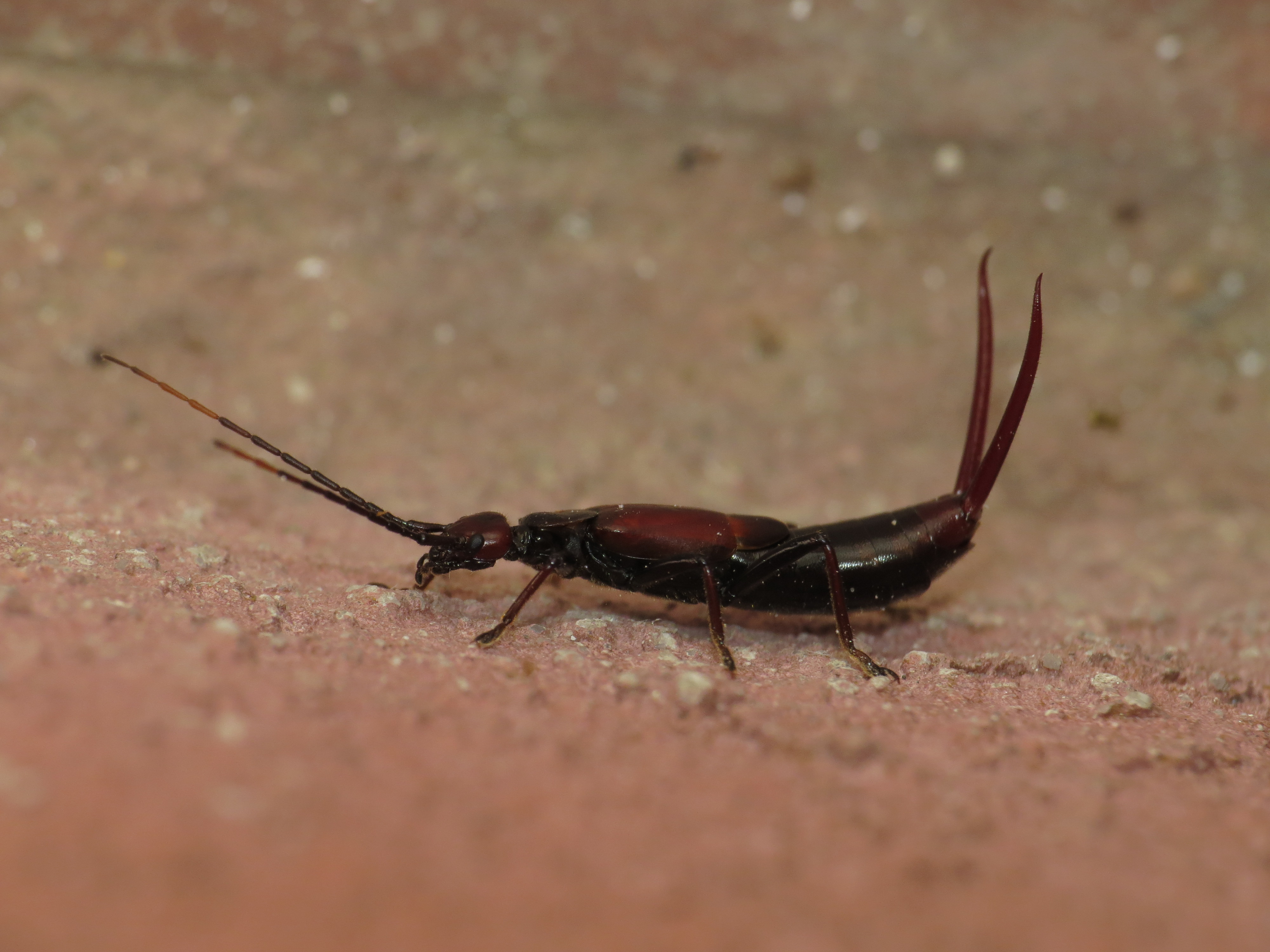
- Timomenus komarowi

Scientific classification
- Kingdom: Animalia
- Phylum: Arthropoda
- Class: Insecta
- Order: Dermaptera
- Family: Forficulidae
- Subfamily: Opisthocosmiinae
- Genus: Timomenus; Burr, 1907

Synonyms
- Rhadamanthus Burr, 1907

= Timomenus =

Genus of earwigs

Timomenus is a genus of Asian earwigs, in the subfamily Opisthocosmiinae, erected by Malcolm Burr in 1907.

== Species ==
The Global Biodiversity Information Facility includes:

1. Timomenus aeris (Shiraki, 1905)
2. Timomenus aesculapius (Burr, 1905)
3. Timomenus amblyotus Ma & Chen, 1992
4. Timomenus ares (Burr, 1900)
5. Timomenus bicolor Sun, Li & Liu Xianwei, 2016
6. Timomenus bicostatus Borelli, 1932
7. Timomenus bicuspis (Stal, 1860)
8. Timomenus bii Sun, Li & Liu Xianwei, 2016
9. Timomenus dilatatus Zhang & Et Al., 1999
10. Timomenus haddeni Srivastava, 1976
11. Timomenus jacobsoni Borelli, 1927
12. Timomenus josephi Srivastava, 1977
13. Timomenus komarowi (Semenov, 1901)
14. Timomenus lobophoroides (Dohrn, 1865)
15. Timomenus longiforceps Srivastava, 1978
16. Timomenus lugens (de Bormans, 1894)
17. Timomenus nevilli (Burr, 1904)
18. Timomenus oannes (Burr, 1900)
19. Timomenus pieli Hincks, 1940
20. Timomenus robustus Srivastava, 1976
21. Timomenus shelfordi (Burr, 1904)
22. Timomenus sinuatus Srivastava, 1976
23. Timomenus vicinus (Burr, 1904)
