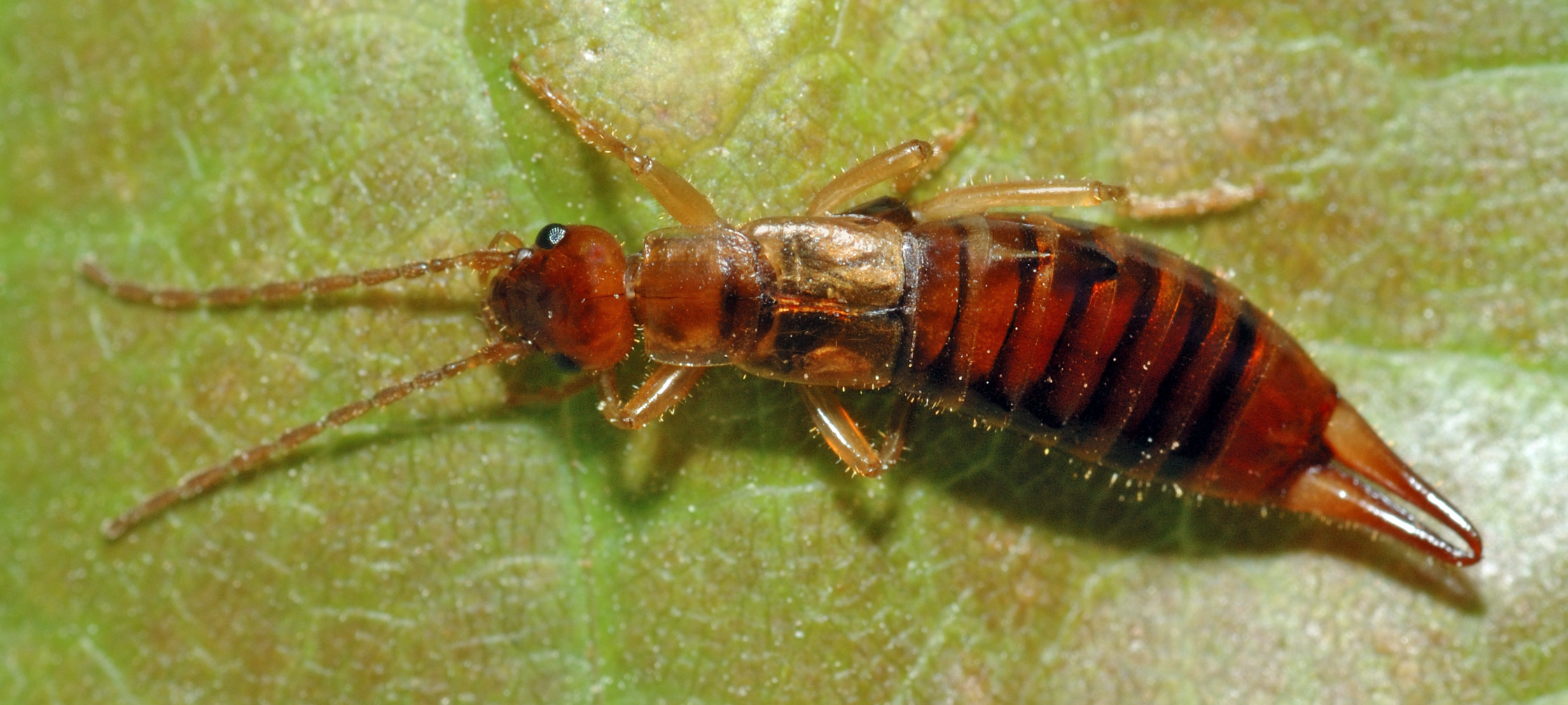
- Apterygida albipennis

Scientific classification
- Kingdom: Animalia
- Phylum: Arthropoda
- Class: Insecta
- Order: Dermaptera
- Family: Forficulidae
- Subfamily: Forficulinae
- Genus: Apterygida; Westwood, 1840

= Apterygida =

Genus of insects

Apterygida is a genus of insects belonging to the family Forficulidae.

The species of this genus are found in Europe.

Species:

- Apterygida albipennis (Hagenbach, 1822)
- Apterygida tuberculosa Shiraki, 1905
