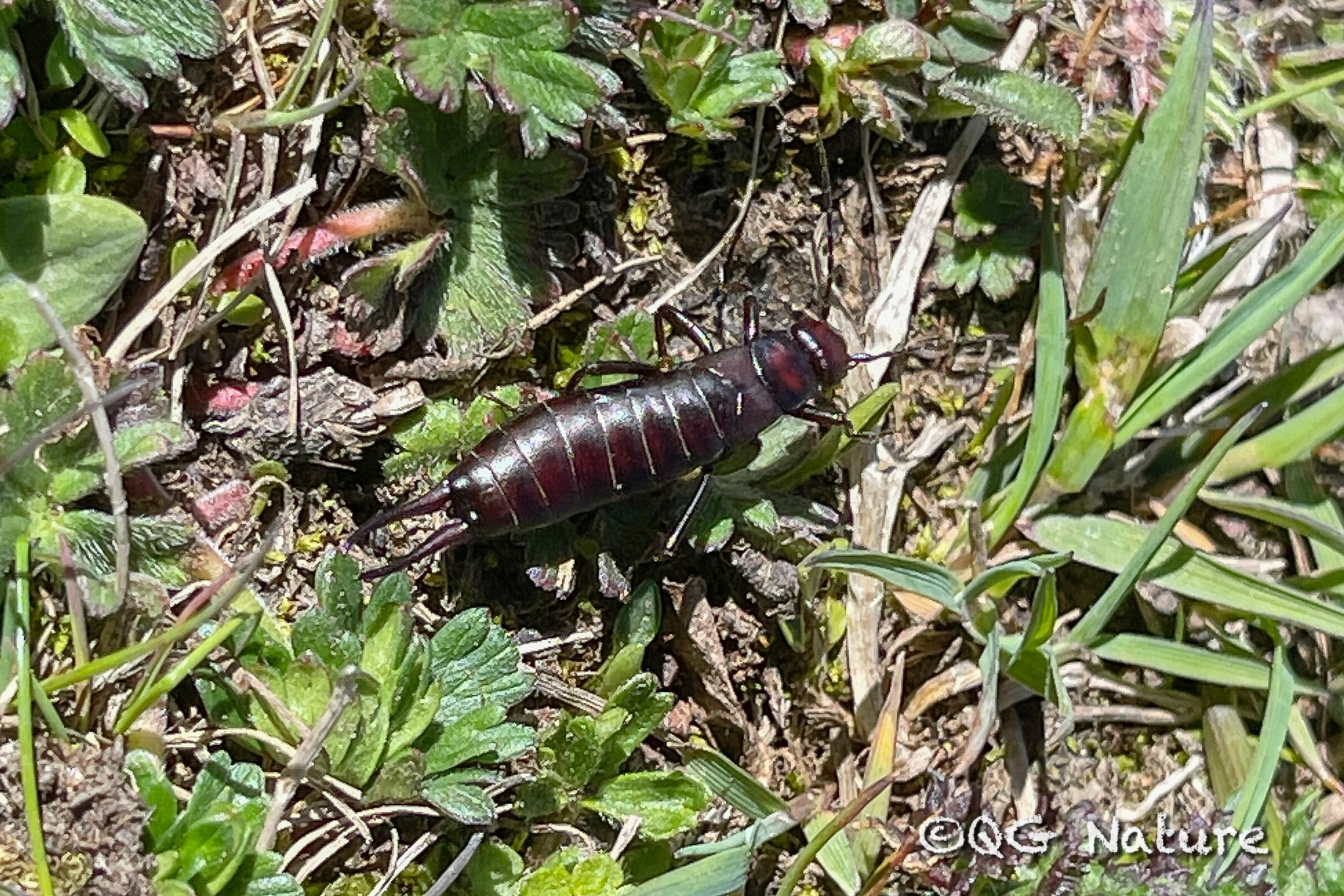
- Female Chelidura siguniangshana

Scientific classification
- Kingdom: Animalia
- Phylum: Arthropoda
- Clade: Pancrustacea
- Class: Insecta
- Order: Dermaptera
- Family: Forficulidae
- Subfamily: Anechurinae
- Genus: Chelidura; Latreille, 1825

Species
- See text

Synonyms
- List: Borelliola Semenov, 1908; Burriola Semenov, 1908; Chelidoura Géné, 1832; Chelidurella Verhoeff, 1902; Maraniola Harz & Kaltenbach, 1976; Mesochelidura Verhoeff, 1902

= Chelidura =

Genus of earwigs

Chelidura is a genus of earwigs in the family Forficulidae found in continental Europe, including southern Scandinavia.

== Species ==
The following species are accepted in the genus Chelidura:

- Chelidura alpina (Bonelli, 1832)
- Chelidura aptera (von Muhlfeld, 1825)
- Chelidura arverna David & Van Herrewege, 1973
- Chelidura dalijiashana Chen, 2025
- Chelidura euxina (Semenov, 1907)
- Chelidura farkaci Kočárek, 2004
- Chelidura gansuensis Chen, 2025
- Chelidura montana (Gené, 1832)
- Chelidura nuristanica Steinmann, 1977
- Chelidura osellarum Kočárek, Fontana & Ruzzier, 2026
- Chelidura przewalskii (Semenov, 1908)
- Chelidura pyrenaica (Bonelli, 1832)
- Chelidura redux (Semenov, 1908)
- Chelidura rhaetica Kočárek, Fontana & Ruzzier, 2026
- Chelidura russica Steinmann, 1977
- Chelidura semenovi Bey-Bienko, 1934
- Chelidura siguniangshana Chen, 2024
- Chelidura specifica Steinmann, 1989
- Chelidura thoracica Fischer von Waldheim, 1846
- Chelidura tibetana (Semenov Tian-Shansky & Bey-Bienko, 1935)
- Chelidura transsilvanica Ebner, 1932
