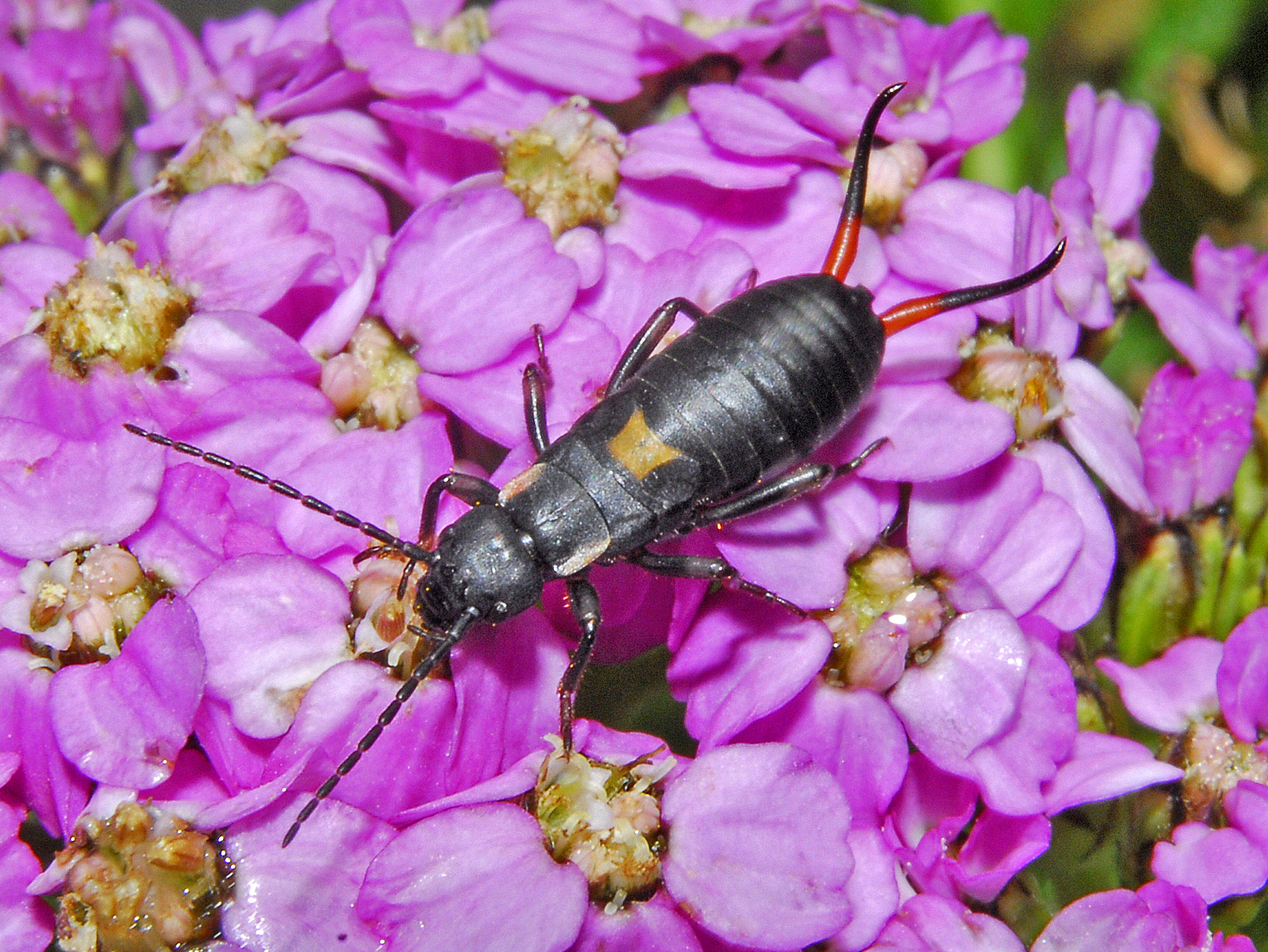
- Anechura bipunctata (immature)

Scientific classification
- Domain: Eukaryota
- Kingdom: Animalia
- Phylum: Arthropoda
- Class: Insecta
- Order: Dermaptera
- Suborder: Neodermaptera
- Infraorder: Epidermaptera
- Superfamily: Forficuloidea
- Family: Forficulidae
- Subfamily: Anechurinae; Burr, 1907

= Anechurinae =

Subfamily of earwigs

Anechurinae is a subfamily of earwigs in the family Forficulidae. There are more than 70 described species in Anechurinae.

== Genera ==
The Dermaptera Species File includes:

1. Anechura Scudder, 1876
2. Chelidura Latreille, 1825
3. Chelidurella Verhoeff, 1902
4. Eumegalura Bey-Bienko, 1934
5. Mesasiobia Semenov, 1908
6. Mesochelidura Verhoeff, 1902
7. Neopterygida Srivastava, 1984
8. Oreasiobia Semenov, 1936
9. Perirrhytus Burr, 1911
10. Pseudochelidura Verhoeff, 1902
11. Pterygida Verhoeff, 1902
