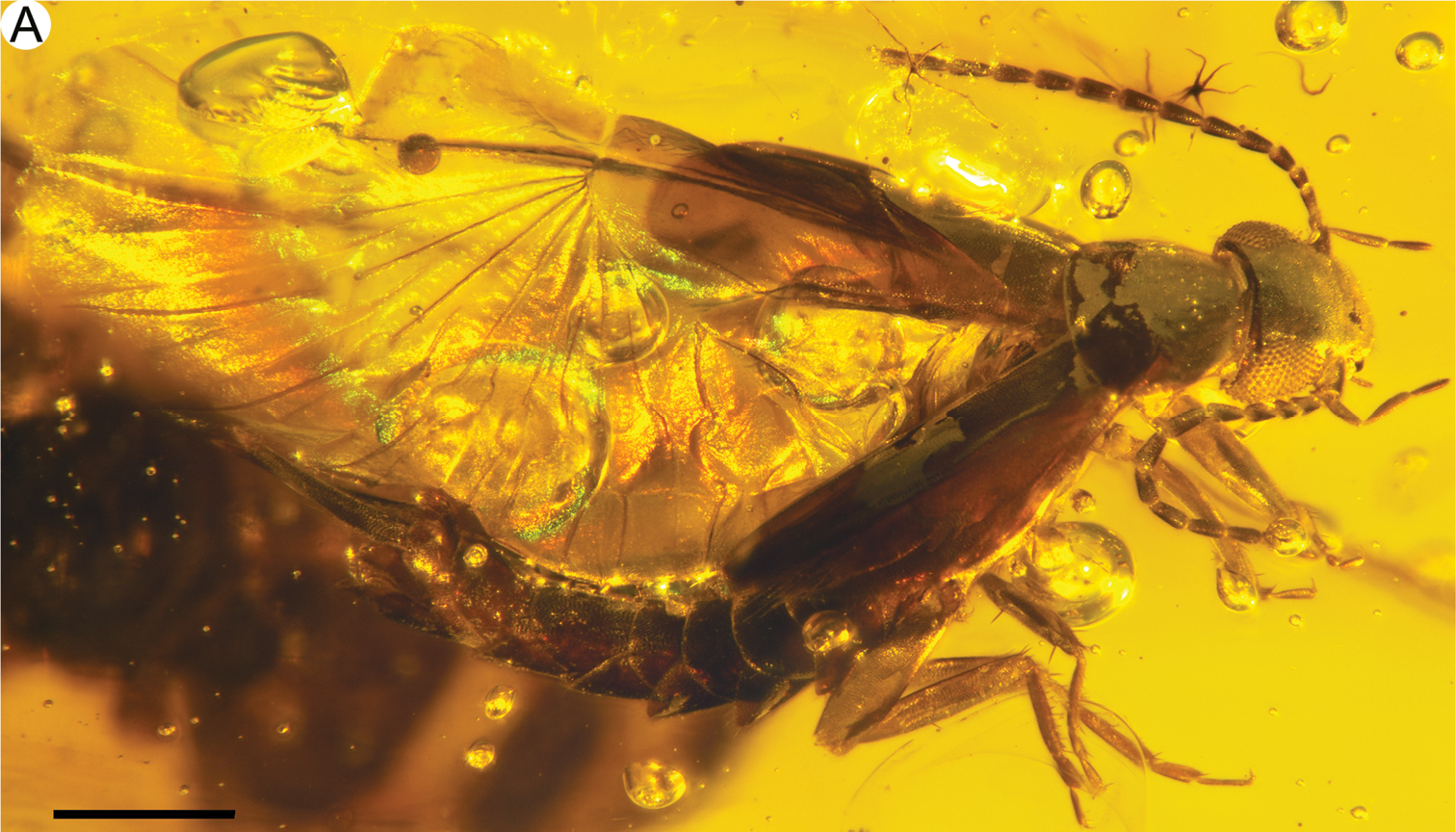
- Astreptolabis laevis

Scientific classification
- Domain: Eukaryota
- Kingdom: Animalia
- Phylum: Arthropoda
- Class: Insecta
- Order: Dermaptera
- Suborder: Neodermaptera
- Infraorder: Protodermaptera
- Superfamily: Pygidicranoidea
- Family: Pygidicranidae; Verhoeff, 1902

Subfamilies and genera
- See text

= Pygidicranidae =

Pygidicranidae Temporal range: Aptian–recent

Family of earwigs

Pygidicranidae is a family of earwigs in the suborder Neodermaptera. The family currently contains twelve subfamilies and twenty six genera. Eight of the subfamilies are monotypic, each containing a single genus. Of the subfamilies, both Astreptolabidinae and Burmapygiinae are extinct and known solely from fossils found in Burmese amber. Similarly Archaeosoma, Gallinympha, and Geosoma, which have not been placed into any of the subfamilies, are also known only from fossils. Living members of the family are found in Australia, South Africa, North America, and Asia. The monotypic genus Anataelia, described by Ignacio Bolivar in 1899, is found only on the Canary Islands. As with all members of Neodermaptera, pygidicranids do not have any ocelli. The typical pygidicranid bodyplan includes a small, flattened-looking body, which has a dense covering of bristly hairs (setae). The pair of cerci at the end of the abdomen are symmetrical in structure. The head is broad, with the fourth, fifth and sixth antenna segments (antennomeres) that are not transverse. In general Pygidicranids also have equally sized ventral cervical sclerites, and in having the rearmost sclerite separated from, or only touching the center of the prosternum. Cannibalism of young has been observed in at least one species in the family, Challia hongkongensis, in which an adult female was found eating a still-living nymph of the same species. The same species in a different area has been observed possibly eating fruits or seeds, making the species an omnivore.

== Taxonomy ==
Current Pygidicranidae subfamilies and genera, as listed in the Dermaptera Species File.

Pygidicranidae Verhoeff, 1902

- Genus Cylindopygia Yang et al. 2015 (Aptian;Yixian Formation)
- Subfamily Anataeliinae Burr, 1909 (Syn. Anataelinae)
  - Genus Anataelia Bolivar, 1899
- Subfamily †Astreptolabidinae Engel, 2011
  - Genus †Astreptolabis Engel, 2011 (Cenomanian; Burmese Amber)
- Subfamily Blandicinae Burr, 1915
  - Genus Alloblandex Hincks, 1957
  - Genus Austroblandex Brindle, 1987
  - Genus Blandex Burr, 1912
  - Genus Parablandex Brindle, 1966
- Subfamily Brindlensiinae Srivastava, 1985
  - Genus Brindlensia Srivastava, 1985
- Subfamily †Burmapygiinae Engel & Grimaldi, 2004
  - Genus †Burmapygia Engel & Grimaldi, 2004 (Cenomanian; Burmese Amber)
- Subfamily Challiinae Steinmann, 1973 (Syn. Challinae)
  - Genus Challia Burr, 1904
- Subfamily Cylindrogastrinae Maccagno, 1929
  - Genus Cylindrogaster Stal, 1855
- Subfamily Diplatymorphinae Boeseman, 1954
  - Genus Diplatymorpha Boeseman, 1954
- Subfamily Echinosomatinae Burr, 1910 (Syn. Prolabisciinae, Prolabiscinae, Protolabidinae, Protolabinae)
  - Genus Echinosoma AudinetServille, 1839
  - Genus Parapsalis Borelli, 1921
- Subfamily Esphalmeninae Burr, 1909
  - Genus Esphalmenus Burr, 1909
- Subfamily Pygidicraninae Verhoeff, 1902
  - Genus Acrania Burr, 1915
  - Genus Cranopygia Burr, 1908
  - Genus Dacnodes Burr, 1907
  - Genus Mucrocranopygia Steinmann, 1986
  - Genus Paracranopygia Steinmann, 1986
  - Genus Pygidicrana AudinetServille, 1831
  - Genus Tagalina Dohrn, 1862
- Subfamily Pyragrinae Verhoeff, 1902
  - Genus Echinopsalis de Bormans, 1893
  - Genus Pyragra AudinetServille, 1831
  - Genus Pyragropsis Borelli, 1908
- Subfamily incertae sedis
  - Genus †Archaeosoma Zhang, 1994
  - Genus †Gallinympha Perrichot & Engel, 2011
  - Genus †Geosoma Zhang, 1997
