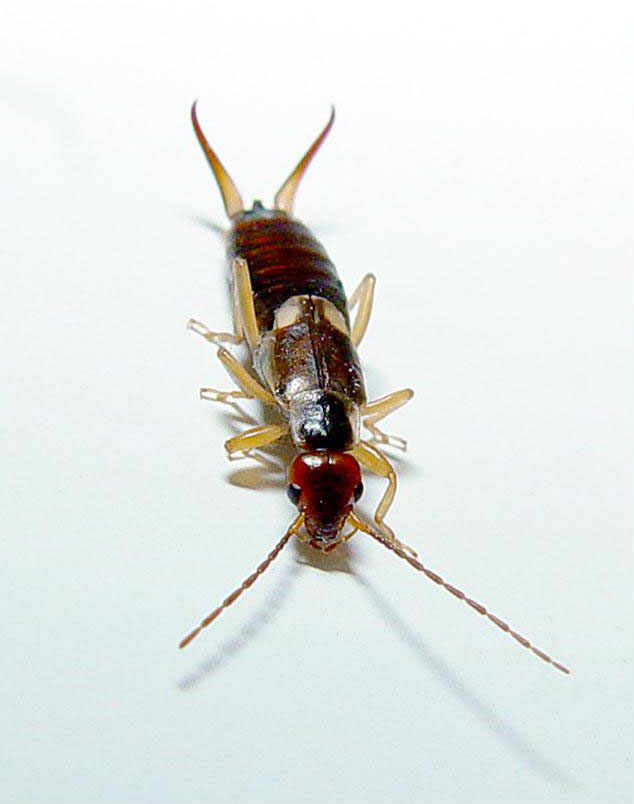
- Forficula auricularia

Scientific classification
- Kingdom: Animalia
- Phylum: Arthropoda
- Class: Insecta
- Order: Dermaptera
- Suborder: Neodermaptera
- Infraorder: Epidermaptera
- Superfamily: Forficuloidea
- Family: Forficulidae; Latreille, 1810

Subfamilies
- Allodahliinae Verhoeff, 1902; Ancistrogastrinae Verhoeff, 1902; Anechurinae Verhoeff, 1902; Diaperasticinae Burr, 1907; Forficulinae Latreille, 1810; Neolobophorinae Burr, 1907; Opisthocosmiinae Verhoeff, 1902; Skendylinae Burr, 1907

= Forficulidae =

Forficulidae Temporal range: Eocene–Recent

Family of earwigs

Forficulidae is a family of earwigs in the order Dermaptera. There are more than 70 genera and more than 500 described species in Forficulidae.

Species in this family include Forficula auricularia (the European earwig or common earwig) and Apterygida media (the short-winged earwig or hop-garden earwig).

Forficulidae was formerly considered a suborder of Dermaptera, Forficulina, but was reduced in rank to family and placed in suborder Neodermaptera.

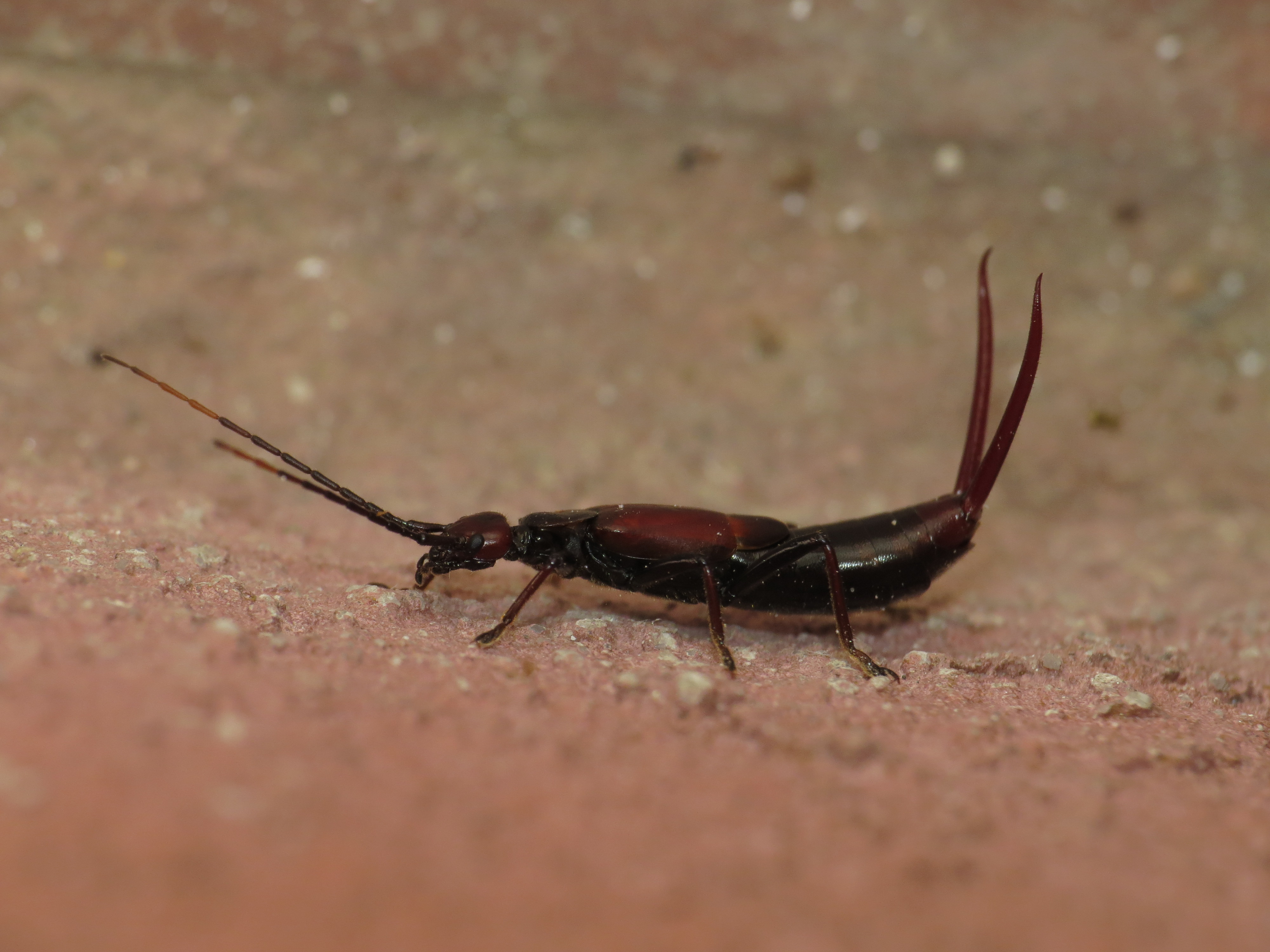
Timomenus komarovi

== Genera ==
- Acanthocordax Günther, 1929
- Afrocosmia Hincks, 1960
- Afroforficula Steinmann, 1990
- Allodahlia Verhoeff, 1902
- Ancistrogaster Stal, 1855
- Anechura Scudder, 1876
- Apterygida Westwood, 1840
- Brachycosmiella Steinmann, 1990
- Brindleiana Steinmann, 1975
- Chaetocosmia Nishikawa, 1973
- Chamaipetes Burr, 1907
- Chelidura Latreille, 1825
- Chelidurella Verhoeff, 1902
- Cipex Burr, 1910
- Cordax Burr, 1910
- Cosmiella Verhoeff, 1902
- Cosmiola Bey-Bienko, 1959
- Diaperasticus Burr, 1907
- Doru Burr, 1907
- Dubianus Estrada-Alvarez & Nunez-Bazan, 2022
- Elaunon Burr, 1907
- Eparchus Burr, 1907
- Eudohrnia Burr, 1907
- Eulithinus Hincks, 1935
- Eumegalura Bey-Bienko, 1934
- Eutimomena Bey-Bienko, 1970
- Forcepsia Moreira, 1930
- Forficula Linnaeus, 1758
- Guanchia Burr, 1911
- Hypocosmiella Steinmann, 1993
- Hypurgus Burr, 1907
- Kleter Burr, 1907
- Liparura Burr, 1907
- Lipodes Burr, 1907
- Litocosmia Hebard, 1917
- Mesasiobia Semenov, 1908
- Mesochelidura Verhoeff, 1902
- Mesolabia Shiraki, 1905
- Metresura Rehn, 1922
- Mixocosmia Borelli, 1909
- Neocosmiella Hebard, 1919
- Neolobophora Scudder, 1875
- Neoopisthocosmia Steinmann, 1990
- Neopterygida Srivastava, 1984
- Obelura Burr, 1907
- Opisthocosmia Dohrn, 1865
- Oreasiobia Semenov, 1936
- Osteulcus Burr, 1907
- Parachelidura Chen, 2024
- Paracosmia Borelli, 1909
- Paracosmiella Steinmann, 1990
- Paradohrnia Shiraki, 1928
- Parasondax Srivastava, 1978
- Parasyntonus Steinmann, 1990
- Paratimomenus Steinmann, 1974
- Pareparchus Burr, 1911
- Parlax Burr, 1911
- Perirrhytus Burr, 1911
- Praos Burr, 1907
- Proforficula Steinmann, 1990
- Prosadiya Hebard, 1923
- Pseudochelidura Verhoeff, 1902
- Pterygida Verhoeff, 1902
- Sarcinatrix Rehn, 1903
- Setocordax Brindle, 1970
- Skalistes Burr, 1907
- Sondax Burr, 1910
- Spinosocordax Steinmann, 1988
- Tauropygia Brindle, 1970
- Timomenus Burr, 1907
- Tristanella Borelli, 1909

Also there are 3 fossil genera known:

- † Apanechura Zhang, 1989
- † Forficulites Statz, 1939
- † Hadanechura Zhang Junfeng, Sun Bo & Zhang Xiyu, 1994

Some other fossil genera may belong to this family, but their exact position is uncertain:

- † Chelisoficula Nel, Waller, Albouy, Menier & de Ploeg, 2003
- † Rupiforficula Engel & Chatzimanolis, 2010
