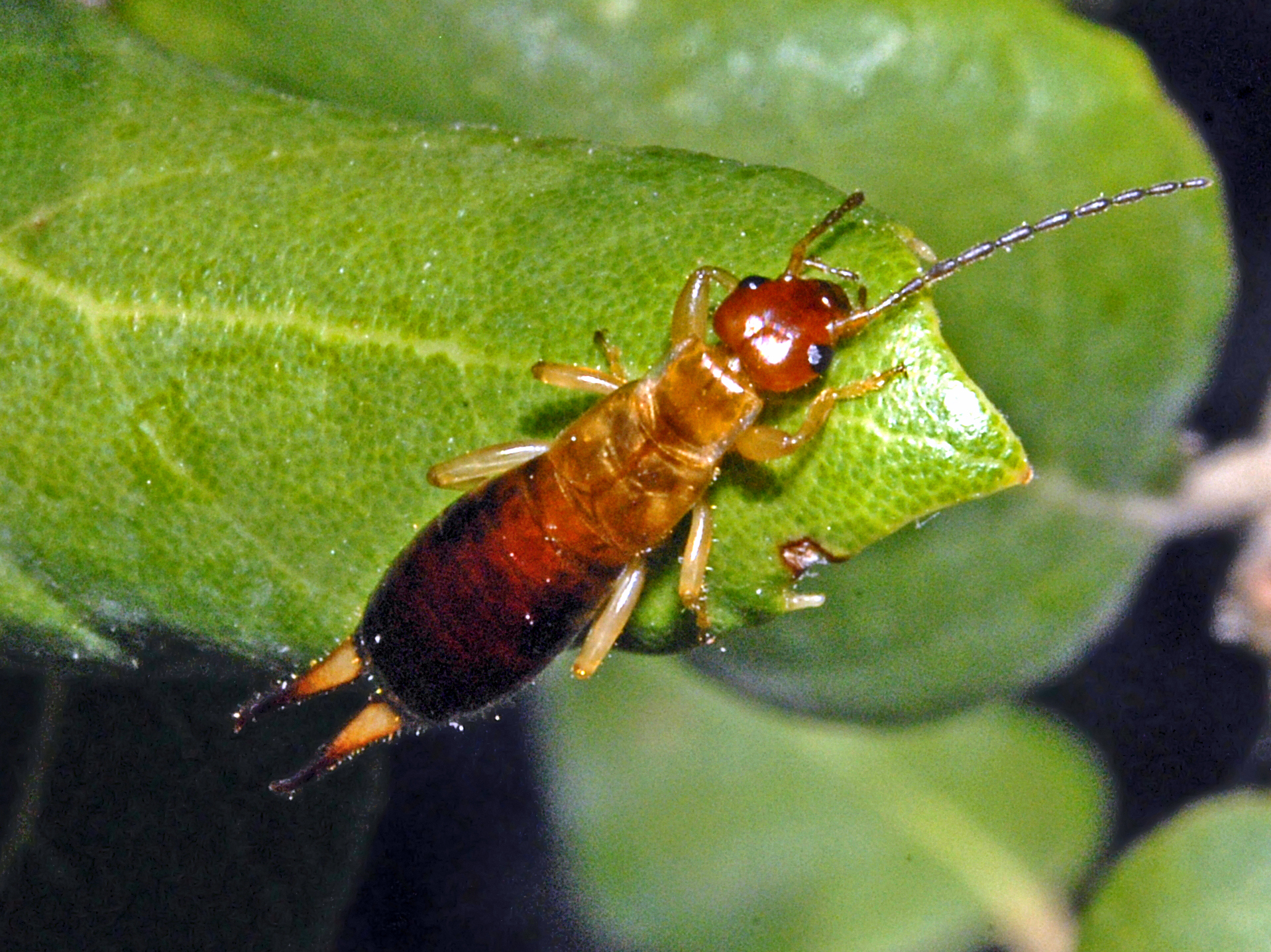
- Forficula decipiens

Scientific classification
- Domain: Eukaryota
- Kingdom: Animalia
- Phylum: Arthropoda
- Class: Insecta
- Order: Dermaptera
- Suborder: Neodermaptera; Engel, 2003

= Neodermaptera =

Neodermaptera Temporal range: Cretaceous–Recent

Suborder of earwigs

Neodermaptera, sometimes called Catadermaptera, is a suborder of earwigs in the order Dermaptera. There are more than 2,000 described species in Neodermaptera.

The former suborders Forficulina, Hemimerina, and Arixeniina have been reduced in rank to family and placed into the new suborder Neodermaptera. Neodermaptera now contains all the extant species of Dermaptera, while the extinct species make up the suborders Archidermaptera and Eodermaptera.

== Families ==
BioLib includes seven superfamilies, with the Dermaptera Species File grouping these into two infraorders and fossil genera incertae sedis:

=== Epidermaptera ===
Infraorder authority: Engel, 2003

==== Anisolabidoidea ====
Authority: Verhoeff, 1902

- Anisolabididae Verhoeff, 1902

==== Apachyoidea ====
Authority: Verhoeff, 1902

- Apachyidae Verhoeff, 1902

==== Forficuloidea ====
Authority: Latreille, 1810 (synonym Forficulina)

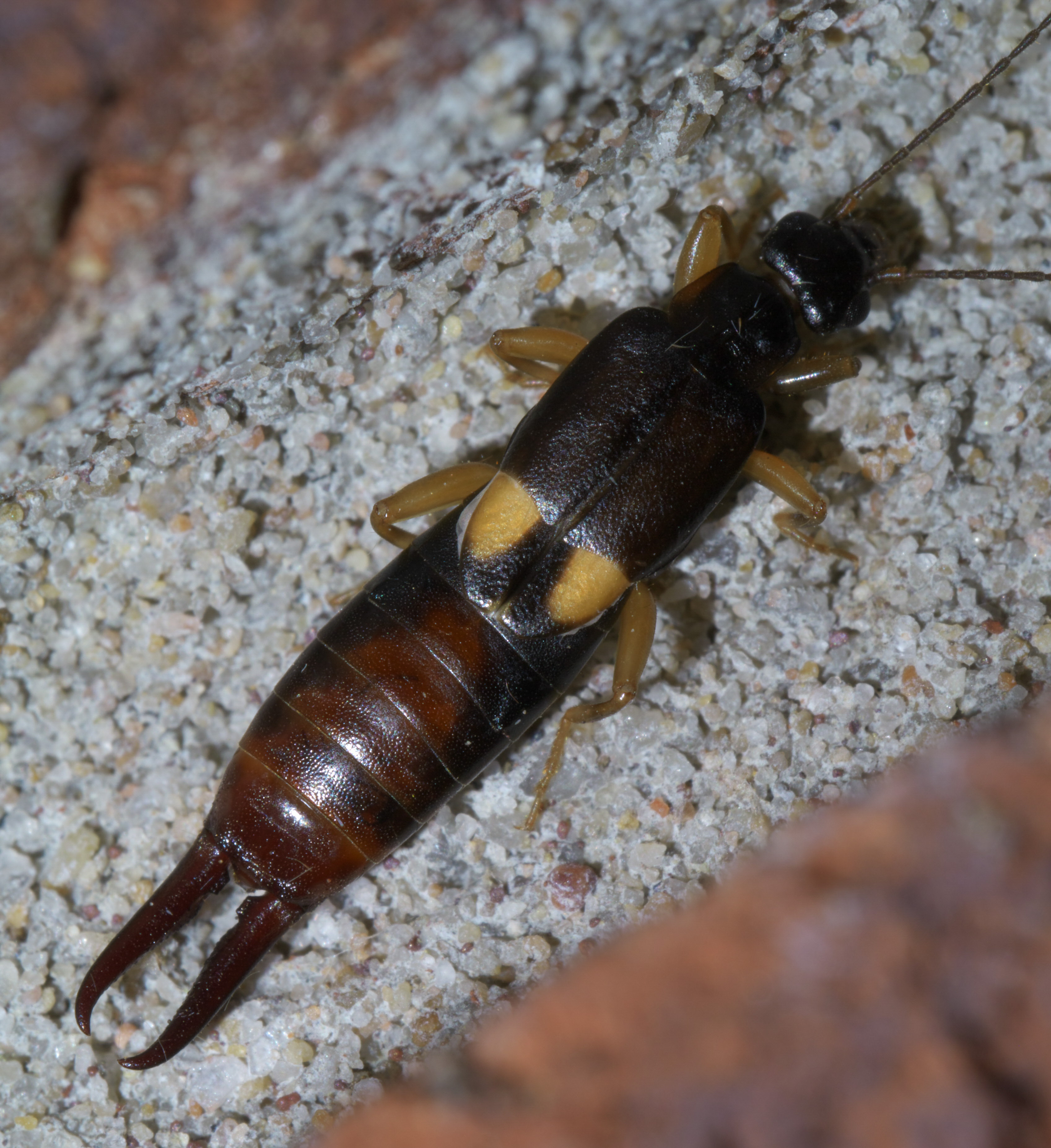
Vostox brunneipennis

- Arixeniidae Jordan, 1909
- Chelisochidae Verhoeff, 1902
- Forficulidae Latreille, 1810
- Spongiphoridae Verhoeff, 1902 - little earwigs: includes Labiinae

==== Hemimeroidea ====
Authority: Sharp, 1895

- Hemimeridae Sharp, 1895

==== Labiduroidea ====
Authority: Verhoeff, 1902

- Labiduridae Verhoeff, 1902 - striped earwigs

=== Protodermaptera ===
Infraorder authority: Zacher, 1910

==== Karschielloidea ====
Authority: Verhoeff, 1902

- Karschiellidae Verhoeff, 1902

==== Pygidicranoidea ====
Authority: Verhoeff, 1902

- Diplatyidae Verhoeff, 1902
- Haplodiplatyidae Engel, 2016: monotypic contains genus Haplodiplatys Hincks, 1955 from Asia
- Pygidicranidae Verhoeff, 1902

=== Fossil genera ===
- †Autrigonoforceps Engel and Peris, 2015
- †Laasbium Scudder, 1900
- †Litholabis Engel & Chatzimanolis, 2010
- †Ocellia Olfers, 1907
- †Petrolabis Engel & Chatzimanolis, 2010
- †Rhadinolabis Engel, Ortega-Blanco & Azar, 2011
- †Rupiforficula Engel & Chatzimanolis, 2010
- †Vendeenympha Engel & Perrichot, 2014
