= Taxonomy of the Dermaptera =

Biological ranks of earwigs

This taxonomy of the Dermaptera follows Engel & Haas (2007) to the rank of genus.

== Taxonomy ==
- Order Dermaptera de Geer, 1773
  - Suborder †Archidermaptera Bey-Bienko, 1936
    - Superfamily †Protodiplatyoidea Martynov, 1925a
      - Family †Protodiplatyidae Martynov, 1925a
        - Genus †Abrderma Xing, Shih, & Ren, 2016
        - Genus †Aneuroderma Xiong, Engel, & Ren, 2021
        - Genus †Anisodiplatys Vishniakova, 1980
        - Genus †Applanatiforceps Yin, Shih, Engel, & Ren, 2021
        - Genus †Archidermapteron Vishniakova, 1980
        - Genus †Asiodiplatys Vishniakova, 1980
        - Genus †Babderma Xing, Shih, & Ren, 2016
        - Genus †Brevicula Whalley, 1985
        - Genus †Longicerciata Zhang, 1994
        - Genus †Microdiplatys Vishniakova, 1980
        - Genus †Perissoderma Xing, Shih, & Ren, 2016
        - Genus †Protodiplatys Martynov, 1925
        - Genus †Sinoprotodiplatys Nel, Aria, Garrouste, & Waller, 2012
      - Family †Dermapteridae Vishniakova, 1980
        - Genus †Dacryoderma Engel, 2021
        - Genus †Dimapteron Kelly, Ross, & Jarzembowski, 2016
        - Genus †Dermapteron Martynov, 1925
        - Genus †Grammoderma Yin, Shih, Engel, & Ren, 2024
        - Genus †Jurassimedeola Zhang, 2002
        - Genus †Palaeodermapteron Zhao, Shih, & Ren, 2011
        - Genus †Phanerogramma Cockerell, 1915
        - Genus †Sinoplaeodermata Zhang, 2002
        - Genus †Valdopteron Kelly, Ross, & Jarzembowski, 2016
      - Family †Turanoviidae Engel, 2003
        - Genus †Turanovia Vishniakova, 1980
      - Family †Incertae sedis in †Archidermaptera Bey-Bienko, 1936
        - Genus †Trivenapteron Kelly, Ross, & Jarzembowski, 2016
  - Suborder †Eodermaptera Engel, 2003
    - Superfamily †Bellodermatoidea Zhao, Shih, & Ren, 2010
      - Family †Bellodermatidae Zhao, Shih, & Ren, 2010
        - Genus †Belloderma Zhao, Shih, & Ren, 2010
    - Superfamily †Semenovioloidea Vishniakova, 1980
      - Family †Semenoviolidae Vishniakova, 1980
        - Subfamily †Semenoviolinae Vishniakova, 1980
          - Genus †Semenoviola Vishniakova, 1980
          - Genus †Semenovioloides Vishniakova, 1980
        - Subfamily †Aglyptodermatinae Xiong, Engel, & Ren, 2021
          - Genus †Aglyptoderma Xiong, Engel, & Ren, 2021
          - Genus †Ekpagloderma Yin, Shih, Engel, & Ren, 2023
    - Infraorder †Turanodermaptera Engel, 2019
      - Superfamily †Turanodermatoidea Engel, 2003
        - Family †Turanodermatidae Engel, 2003
          - Genus †Turanoderma Vishniakova, 1980
  - Suborder Neodermaptera Engel, 2003
    - Infraorder Protodermaptera Zacher, 1910
      - Superfamily Diplatyoidea Verhoeff, 1902a
        - Family Diplatyidae Verhoeff, 1902a
          - Genus †Acanthodiplatys Ren, Zhang, Shih, & Ren, 2018
          - Genus Circodiplatys Steinmann, 1986
          - Genus Diplatys Audinet-Serville, 1831
          - Genus †Hirtidiplatys Ren, Zhang, Shih, & Ren, 2018
          - Genus Lobodiplatys Steinmann, 1974
          - Genus Mesodiplatys Steinmann, 1986
          - Genus Schizodiplatys Steinmann, 1974
          - Genus †Tytthodiplatys Engel, 2011
        - Family Haplodiplatyidae Engel, 2017
          - Genus Haplodiplatys Hincks, 1955
          - Genus †Zeugmadiplatys Peng, Engel, Boderau, Zhuo, & Nel, 2024
      - Superfamily Pygidicranoidea Verhoeff, 1902a
        - Family Pygidicranidae Verhoeff, 1902a
          - Subfamily †Astreptolabidinae Engel, 2011
            - Genus †Astreptolabis Engel, 2011
          - Subfamily †Burmapygiinae Engel & Grimaldi, 2004
            - Genus †Burmapygia Engel & Grimaldi, 2004
          - Subfamily Anataeliinae Burr, 1909b
            - Genus Anataelia Bolivar, 1899
          - Subfamily Blandicinae Burr, 1915
            - Genus Alloblandex Hincks, 1957
            - Genus Austroblandex Brindle, 1986
            - Genus Blandex Burr, 1912
            - Genus Parablandex Brindle, 1966
          - Subfamily Brindlesiinae Srivastava, 1985b
            - Genus Brindlesia Srivastava, 1985b
          - Subfamily Challiinae Steinmann, 1973
            - Genus Challia Burr, 1904
          - Subfamily Cylindrogastrinae Maccagno, 1929
            - Genus Cylindrogaster Stål, 1855
          - Subfamily Diplatymorphinae Boeseman, 1954
            - Genus Diplatymorpha Boeseman, 1954
          - Subfamily Echinosomatinae Burr, 1910a
            - Genus Parapsalis Borelli, 1921
            - Genus Echinosoma Audinet-Serville, 1831
          - Subfamily Esphalmeninae Burr, 1909a
            - Genus Esphalmenus Burr, 1909
          - Subfamily Karschiellinae Verhoeff, 1902a
            - Genus Bormansia Verhoeff, 1902
            - Genus Karschiella Verhoeff, 1902
          - Subfamily †Prodacnodinae Peng, Engel, Liu, & Nel, 2024
            - Genus †Prodacnodes Peng, Engel, Liu, & Nel, 2024
          - Subfamily Pygidicraninae Verhoeff, 1902a
            - Genus Acrania Burr, 1915
            - Genus Cranopygia Burr, 1908
            - Genus Dacnodes Burr, 1907
            - Genus Paracranopygia Steinmann, 1986
            - Genus Pygidicrana Audinet-Serville, 1831
            - Genus Tagalina Dohrn, 1863
          - Subfamily Pyragrinae Verhoeff, 1902a
            - Genus Echinopsalis Bormans, 1893
            - Genus †Gracilipygia Ren, Zhang, Shih, & Ren, 2017
            - Genus Pyragra Audinet-Serville, 1831
            - Genus Pyragropsis Borelli, 1908
          - Subfamily †Stonychopygiinae Engel & Huang, 2017
            - Genus †Stonychopygia Engel & Huang, 2017
          - Subfamily Incertae sedis in Pygidicranidae Verhoeff, 1902a
            - Genus †Archaeosoma Zhang, 1994
            - Genus †Eminepygia Chen & Zhang, 2021
            - Genus †Gallinympha Perrichot & Engel, 2011
            - Genus †Geosoma Zhang, 1997
            - Genus †Robustipygia Ren, Zhang, Shih, & Ren, 2018
    - Infraorder Epidermaptera Engel, 2003
      - Parvorder Paradermaptera Verhoeff, 1902a
        - Superfamily Hemimeroidea Sharp, 1895
          - Family Hemimeridae Sharp, 1895
            - Genus Araeomerus Maa, 1974
            - Genus Hemimerus Walker, 1871
        - Superfamily Apachyoidea Verhoeff, 1902a
          - Family Apachyidae Verhoeff, 1902a
            - Genus Apachys Audinet-Serville, 1831
            - Genus Dendroiketes Burr, 1909
      - Parvorder Metadermaptera Engel, 2003
        - Superfamily Anisolabidoidea Verhoeff, 1902a
          - Family Anisolabididae Verhoeff, 1902a
              - Genus Aborolabis Srivastava, 1969
              - Genus Anisolabis Fieber, 1853
              - Genus Canarilabis Steinmann, 1985
              - Genus Carcinophora Scudder, 1876
              - Genus Epilandex Hebard, 1927
              - Genus Euborellia Burr, 1909
              - Genus Flexiolabis Steinmann, 1989
              - Genus Gonolabis Burr, 1910
              - Genus Indolabis Steinmann, 1989
              - Genus Mongolabis Zacher, 1911
              - Genus Neolabis Brindle, 1981
              - Genus Ornatolabis Steinmann, 1989
              - Genus Paraflexiolabis Steinmann, 1989
              - Genus Placolabis Bey-Bienko, 1959
              - Genus Socotralabis Kočárek, 2014
              - Genus Thekalabis Kapoor, 1967
              - Genus Zacheria Steinmann, 1975
            - Subfamily Anophthalmolabidinae Steinmann, 1975
              - Genus Anophthalmolabis Brindle, 1968
            - Subfamily Antisolabidinae Brindle, 1978a
              - Genus Antisolabis Burr, 1911
            - Subfamily Brachylabidinae Burr, 1908a
              - Genus Brachylabis Dohrn, 1864
              - Genus Ctenisolabis Verhoeff, 1902
              - Genus Metisolabis Burr, 1910
            - Subfamily †Cretolabiinae Engel & Haas, 2007
              - Genus †Cretolabia Popham, 1990
            - Subfamily Gonolabininae Popham and Brindle, 1966c
              - Genus Gonolabina Verhoeff, 1902
            - Subfamily Idolopsalidinae Steinmann, 1975
              - Genus Idolopsalis Borelli, 1910
            - Subfamily Isolabidinae Verhoeff, 1902b
              - Genus Africolabis Brindle, 1978
              - Genus Geracodes Hebard, 1917
              - Genus Isolabis Verhoeff, 1902
              - Genus Pterolabis Steinmann, 1989
            - Subfamily Parisolabidinae Verhoeff, 1904
              - Genus Parisolabis Verhoeff, 1904
              - Genus Parisopsalis Burr, 1914
            - Subfamily Platylabiinae Burr, 1911
              - Genus Platylabia Dohrn, 1867
            - Subfamily Titanolabidinae Srivastava, 1982
              - Genus Titanolabis Burr, 1910
            - Subfamily Incertae sedis in Anisolabididae Verhoeff, 1902a
              - Genus †Geroncolabis Engel & Chatzimanolis, 2010
              - Genus †Kotejalabis Engel & Chatzimanolis, 2005
              - Genus †Palaeocarcinophora Engel & Chatzimanolis, 2010
              - Genus †Spiladopygia Engel & Chatzimanolis, 2010
              - Genus †Toxolabis Engel & Grimaldi, 2014
      - Parvorder Eteodermaptera Engel, 2003
        - Nanorder Plesiodermaptera Engel, 2003
          - Superfamily Labiduroidea Verhoeff, 1902a
            - Family Labiduridae Verhoeff, 1902a
              - Subfamily Allostethinae Verhoeff, 1904
                - Genus Allostethella Zacher, 1910
                - Genus Allostethus Verhoeff, 1904
                - Genus Gonolabidura Zacher, 1910
                - Genus Protolabidura Steinmann, 1985
              - Subfamily Labidurinae Verhoeff, 1902a
                - Genus Forcipula Bolivar, 1897
                - Genus Labidura Leach, 1815
                - Genus Tomopygia Burr, 1904
              - Subfamily †Metaxylabidinae Peng, Engel, Zhou, & Nel, 2024
                - Genus †Metaxylabis Peng, Engel, Zhou, & Nel, 2024
              - Subfamily Nalinae Steinmann, 1975
                - Genus Nala Zacher, 1910
              - Subfamily †Zigrasolabidinae Engel, 2022
                - Genus †Zigrasolabis Engel & Grimaldi, 2014
                - Genus †Tricholabidura Peng & Engel, 2022
              - Subfamily Incertae sedis in Labiduridae Verhoeff, 1902a
                - Genus †Acantholabis Mao, Engel, & Ren, 2020
                - Genus †Caririlabia Martins-Neto, 1990
                - Genus †Myrrholabia Engel & Grimaldi, 2004
        - Nanorder Eudermaptera Verhoeff, 1902a
          - Superfamily Forficuloidea Latreille, 1810
            - Family Arixeniidae Jordan, 1909
              - Genus Arixenia Jordan, 1909
              - Genus Xeniaria Maa, 1974
            - Family Spongiphoridae Verhoeff, 1902a
              - Subfamily Caecolabiinae Steinmann, 1990
                - Genus Caecolabia Brindle, 1975
              - Subfamily Cosmogeracinae Brindle, 1982
                - Genus Cosmogerax Hebard, 1933
              - Subfamily Geracinae Brindle, 1971
                - Genus Apterogerax Engel, 2017
                - Genus Barygerax Hebard, 1917
                - Genus Eugerax Hebard, 1917
                - Genus Gerax Hebard, 1917
                - Genus †Nesogerax Engel, 2017
                - Genus Pseudovostox Borelli, 1926
                - Genus Yepezia Brindle, 1982
              - Subfamily Isolaboidinae Brindle, 1978b
                - Genus Isolaboides Hincks, 1958
                - Genus Paralaboides Steinmann, 1989
              - Subfamily Isopyginae Hincks, 1951
                - Genus Isopyge Borelli, 1931
              - Subfamily Labiinae Burr, 1909b
                - Genus Chaetolabia Brindle, 1972
                - Genus Circolabia Steinmann, 1987
                - Genus Isolabella Verhoeff, 1902
                - Genus Labia Leach, 1815
                - Genus Paralabella Steinmann, 1990
                - Genus Paraspania Steinmann, 1985
                - Genus Sphingolabis Bormans, 1883
                - Genus Spirolabia Steinmann, 1987
              - Subfamily Nesogastrinae Verhoeff, 1902a
                - Genus Nesogaster Verhoeff, 1902
              - Subfamily Nesolabiinae Engel, 2017
                - Genus Nesolabia Hincks, 1957
              - Subfamily Pericominae Burr, 1911a
                - Genus Parapericomus Ramamurthi, 1967
                - Genus Pericomus Burr, 1911
              - Subfamily Ramamurthiinae Steinmann, 1975
                - Genus Ramamurthia Steinmann, 1975
              - Subfamily Rudracinae Srivastava, 1995
                - Genus Rudrax Srivastava, 1995
              - Subfamily Sparattinae Verhoeff, 1902a
                - Tribe Auchenomini Burr, 1909b
                  - Genus Auchenomus Karsch, 1886
                - Tribe Chaetospaniini Steinmann, 1990
                  - Genus Chaetospania Karsch, 1886
                - Tribe Sparattini Verhoeff, 1902a
                  - Genus Mecomera Audinet-Serville, 1838
                  - Genus Sparatta Audinet-Serville, 1838
              - Subfamily Spongiphorinae Verhoeff, 1902a
                - Genus Filolabia Steinmann, 1989
                - Genus Formicilabia Rehn & Hebard, 1917
                - Genus Homotages Burr, 1909
                - Genus †Ikelus Estrada-Álvarez & Núñez-Bázan, 2023
                - Genus Irdex Burr, 1911
                - Genus Marava Burr, 1911
                - Genus Pseudomarava Steinmann, 1989
                - Genus Purex Burr, 1911
                - Genus Spongiphora Audinet-Serville, 1831
                - Genus Spongovostox Burr, 1911
                - Genus Vostox Burr, 1911
              - Subfamily Strongylopsalinae Burr, 1911a
                - Genus Strongylolabis Steinmann, 1986
                - Genus Strongylopsalis Burr, 1900
              - Subfamily Vandicinae Burr, 1911a
                - Genus Vandex Burr, 1911
              - Subfamily Incertae sedis in Spongiphoridae Verhoeff, 1902
                - Genus Paratages Srivastava, 1987
            - Family Chelisochidae Verhoeff, 1902a
              - Subfamily Chelisochinae Verhoeff, 1902a
                - Genus Adiathella Brindle, 1970
                - Genus Adiathetus Burr, 1907
                - Genus Chelisochella Verhoeff, 1902
                - Genus Chelisoches Scudder, 1876
                - Genus †Chelisoficula Nel, Waller, Albouy, Menier, & de Ploëg, 2003
                - Genus Euenkrates Rehn, 1927
                - Genus Exypnus Burr, 1907
                - Genus Gressitolabis Brindle, 1970
                - Genus Hamaxas Burr, 1907
                - Genus Lamprophorella Mjöberg, 1924
                - Genus Proreus Burr, 1907
                - Genus Schizochelisoches Steinmann, 1987
                - Genus Schizoproreus Steinmann, 1987
                - Genus Solenosoma Burr, 1907
              - Subfamily Genitalatinae Steinmann, 1987
                - Genus Genitalata Kapoor, 1974
              - Subfamily Kinesinae Srivastava, 2003
                - Genus Kinesis Burr, 1907
              - Subfamily Incertae sedis in Chelisochidae Verhoeff, 1902a
                - Genus †Amblypygia Engel, 2016
                - Genus †Sthenotropis Engel, 2016
            - Family Forficulidae Latreille, 1810
              - Subfamily Allodahliinae Verhoeff, 1902a
                - Genus Allodahlia Verhoeff, 1902
                - Genus Brindleiana Steinmann, 1975
                - Genus Eulithinus Hincks, 1935
              - Subfamily Ancistrogastrinae Verhoeff, 1902a
                - Genus Ancistrogaster Stål, 1855
                - Genus Litocosmia Hebard, 1917
                - Genus Osteulcus Burr, 1907
                - Genus Paracosmia Borelli, 1909
                - Genus Praos Burr, 1907
                - Genus Sarcinatrix Rehn, 1903
              - Subfamily Anechurinae Verhoeff, 1902a
                - Genus Anechura Scudder, 1876
                - Genus Chelidura Latreille, 1825
                - Genus Chelidurella Verhoeff, 1902
                - Genus Eumegalura Bey-Bienko, 1934
                - Genus Mesasiobia Semenov, 1908
                - Genus Mesochelidura Verhoeff, 1902
                - Genus Neopterygidea Srivastava, 1984
                - Genus Oreasiobia Semenov, 1936
                - Genus Perirrhytus Burr, 1911
                - Genus Pseudochelidura Verhoeff, 1902
                - Genus Pterygidea Verhoeff, 1902
              - Subfamily Diaperasticinae Burr, 1907
                - Genus Diaperasticus Burr, 1907
              - Subfamily Forficulinae Latreille, 1810
                - Genus Afroforficula Steinmann, 1990
                - Genus Apterygidea Westwood, 1840
                - Genus Champaipites Burr, 1907
                - Genus Doru Burr, 1907
                - Genus Elaunon Burr, 1907
                - Genus Forficula Linnaeus, 1758
                - Genus Guanchia Burr, 1911
                - Genus Mesolabia Shiraki, 1905
                - Genus Parlax Burr, 1911
                - Genus Proforficula Steinmann, 1990
                - Genus Skalistes Burr, 1907
                - Genus †Succiniforcipula Engel, 2016
                - Genus Tauropygia Brindle, 1970
              - Subfamily Neolobophorinae Burr, 1907
                - Genus Dubianus Estrada-Álvarez & Núñez-Bázan, 2022
                - Genus Eudohrnia Burr, 1907
                - Genus Metresura Rehn, 1922
                - Genus Neolobophora Scudder, 1875
                - Genus Setocordax Brindle, 1970
                - Genus Tristanella Borelli, 1909
              - Subfamily Opisthocosmiinae Verhoeff, 1902a
                - Genus Acanthocordax Günther, 1929
                - Genus Chaetocosmia Nishikawa, 1973
                - Genus Cipex Burr, 1910
                - Genus Cordax Burr, 1910
                - Genus Eparchus Burr, 1907
                - Genus Eutimomena Bey-Bienko, 1970
                - Genus Hypurgus Burr, 1907
                - Genus Neoopisthocosmia Steinmann, 1990
                - Genus Opisthocosmia Dohrn, 1865
                - Genus Parasondax Srivastava, 1978
                - Genus Parasyntonus Steinmann, 1990
                - Genus Paratimomenus Steinmann, 1974
                - Genus Pareparchus Burr, 1911
                - Genus Prosadiya Hebard, 1923
                - Genus Sondax Burr, 1910
                - Genus Spinosocordax Steinmann, 1988
                - Genus Syntonus Burr, 1910
                - Genus Timomenus Burr, 1907
              - Subfamily Skendylinae Burr, 1907
                - Genus Afrocosmia Hincks, 1960
                - Genus Brachycosmiella Steinmann, 1990
                - Genus Cosmiella Verhoeff, 1902
                - Genus Cosmiola Bey-Bienko, 1959
                - Genus Forcepsia Moreira, 1930
                - Genus Kleter Burr, 1907
                - Genus Liparura Burr, 1907
                - Genus Lipodes Burr, 1907
                - Genus Mixocosmia Borelli, 1909
                - Genus Neocosmiella Hebard, 1919
                - Genus Obelura Burr, 1907
                - Genus Paracosmiella Steinmann, 1990
              - Subfamily Incertae sedis in Forficulidae Latreille, 1810
                - Genus †Rupiforficula Engel & Chatzimanolis, 2010
            - Family Incertae sedis in Forficuloidea Latreille, 1810
              - Genus †Litholabis Engel & Chatzimanolis, 2010
              - Genus †Petrolabis Engel & Chatzimanolis, 2010
          - Superfamily Incertae sedis in Epidermaptera Engel, 2003
            - Genus †Autrigonoforceps Engel & Peris, 2015
            - Genus †Laasbium Scudder, 1900
            - Genus †Labiduromma Scudder, 1890
            - Genus †Rhadinolabis Engel, Ortega-Blanco, & Azar, 2011

== Nomina dubia ==
Family †Ocelliidae Ewing, 1942 is considered a nomen dubium.
