= Anisolabella braueri =

Scientific classification
- Domain: Eukaryota
- Kingdom: Animalia
- Phylum: Arthropoda
- Class: Insecta
- Order: Dermaptera
- Family: Anisolabididae
- Genus: Anisolabella
- Species: A. braueri

Binomial name
- Anisolabella braueri Zacher 1911

Species of earwig

Anisolabella braueri is a species of earwig in the genus Anisolabella, the family Anisolabididae, and the order Dermaptera. Primarily found in the Afrotropical realm, this species was first classified by Zacher in 1911.
