= Ctenisolabis montana =

Scientific classification
- Domain: Eukaryota
- Kingdom: Animalia
- Phylum: Arthropoda
- Class: Insecta
- Order: Dermaptera
- Family: Anisolabididae
- Genus: Ctenisolabis
- Species: C. montana

Binomial name
- Ctenisolabis montana (Borelli, 1909)

Synonyms
- Brachylabis montana Borelli, 1909

Species of earwig

Ctenisolabis montana is a species of earwig in the subfamily Brachylabinae. It is found in the Indomalayan, Palaearctic, and Afrotropical realms.
