= Antisolabis seychellensis =

Conservation status
- Critically Endangered (IUCN 3.1)

Scientific classification
- Kingdom: Animalia
- Phylum: Arthropoda
- Class: Insecta
- Order: Dermaptera
- Family: Anisolabididae
- Genus: Antisolabis
- Species: A. seychellensis

Binomial name
- Antisolabis seychellensis (Brindle, 1976)
- Distribution map of Anisolabis seychellensis

Species of insect

Antisolabis seychellensis is a rare species of earwig in the family Carciniphoridae, endemic to Mahé, the main island of the Seychelles. It is considered critically endangered. Antisolabis seychellensis is found exclusively in an area called Morne Blanc on the island of Mahé, a restricted habitat disturbed by invasive plant species such as Ceylon Cinnamon and Jamrosat.

Antisolabis seychellensis was first studied and described in 1976 by entomologist Alan Brindle. Although its population cannot be precisely quantified, it may be declining due to threats to its habitat. As such, the International Union for Conservation of Nature considers it a "critically endangered species" (CR) and included it in the list of the 100 most threatened species in the world in September 2012.

== Taxonomy ==
The species Antisolabis seychellensis was initially described in 1976 by Alan Brindle under the protonym Brachylabis seychellensis.

== Distribution and habitat ==
The distribution of the species is extremely small, measuring approximately 5 km^{2} (1.9 sq mi) in an area called Morne Blanc on the island of Mahé, the main island of the Seychelles. Its habitat consists of leaf litter in the humid forest.

== Threats ==
Antisolabis seychellensis is considered critically endangered by the International Union for Conservation of Nature (IUCN) and was included in The world's 100 most threatened species by the IUCN Species Survival Commission (SSC) and the Zoological Society of London (ZSL) during the IUCN World Conservation Congress in 2012. The species is threatened with extinction due to its restricted habitat, and the introduction and rapid invasion of plant species, notably Ceylon cinnamon (Cinnamomum verum) and Syzygium jambos.
