= Pacific earwig =

Scientific classification
- Domain: Eukaryota
- Kingdom: Animalia
- Phylum: Arthropoda
- Class: Insecta
- Order: Dermaptera
- Family: Anisolabididae
- Genus: Anisolabis
- Species: A. pacifica

Binomial name
- Anisolabis pacifica (Erichson, 1842)

Species of earwig

The Pacific earwig (Anisolabis pacifica) is a species of earwig in the genus Anisolabis, the family Anisolabididae and the order Dermaptera.
