= Anisolabis howarthi =

Scientific classification
- Kingdom: Animalia
- Phylum: Arthropoda
- Class: Insecta
- Order: Dermaptera
- Family: Anisolabididae
- Genus: Anisolabis
- Species: A. howarthi

Binomial name
- Anisolabis howarthi Brindle, 1979

Species of earwig

Anisolabis howarthi is a blind, troglobite species of earwig in the genus Anisolabis, the family Anisolabididae, and the order Dermaptera. The species is native to Hawaii, and was first classified by Brindle in 1979. According to a paper published by him in 1980 in the journal Pacific Insects, the species is first known true troglobite earwig; while there are other blind species that live underneath soil or humus, this is the first to actually inhabit a cave.
