= Aborolabis mauritanica =

Scientific classification
- Domain: Eukaryota
- Kingdom: Animalia
- Phylum: Arthropoda
- Class: Insecta
- Order: Dermaptera
- Family: Anisolabididae
- Genus: Aborolabis
- Species: A. mauritanica

Binomial name
- Aborolabis mauritanica Lucas, 1846

Species of earwig

Aborolabis mauritanica is a species of earwig in the genus Aborolabis, the family Anisolabididae, and the order Dermaptera. Found primarily in the Palearctic realm, but also in parts of the Afrotropical realm, this species was discovered by Hippolyte Lucas in 1846.
