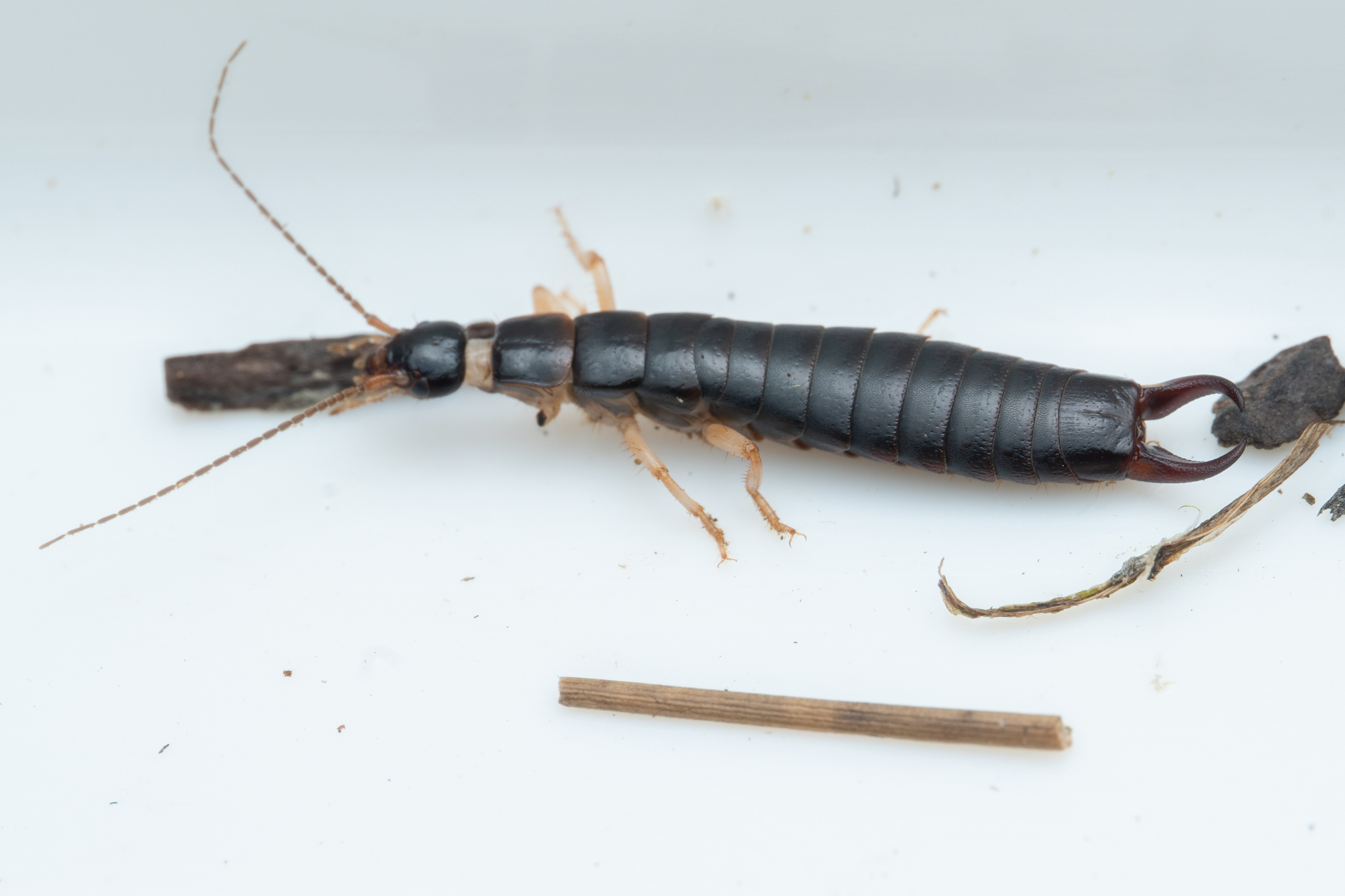

Scientific classification
- Kingdom: Animalia
- Phylum: Arthropoda
- Clade: Pancrustacea
- Class: Insecta
- Order: Dermaptera
- Family: Anisolabididae
- Genus: Anisolabis
- Species: A. maritima

Binomial name
- Anisolabis maritima (Bonelli, 1832)

= Anisolabis maritima =

Species of earwig

Anisolabis maritima, commonly known as the maritime earwig or the seaside earwig, is a species of earwig in the family Anisolabididae. Similar to the seashore earwig, this species can be found near the shore line, and is cosmopolitan. It can be found in almost all biogeographic realms. Scientists believe that these earwigs originally came from Asia. Since then, however, they have been introduced to North America, and have now spread around the world due to international commerce.

This earwig is approximately 2.5 to 3 cm (1.0–1.2 in) long, and is a grayish or blackish in color with light yellow legs. Unlike many other species of earwigs, it does not have any wings. Male maritime earwigs are known for their characteristically asymmetrical forceps, which they use for mating, for capturing prey, and for protecting themselves. These forceps have even been known to be strong enough to break human skin.

This species preys on many different small invertebrates, including fleas, crickets, ants, small beetles, sowbugs; it even exhibits cannibalistic tendencies. Because of their location on the beach, maritime earwigs are often found under seaweed and driftwood during the day. They prefer “dark, warm, humid places” to stay in.

In maritime earwigs in particular, evidence of filial cannibalism has been found. Filial cannibalism is the practice of a mother eating some of her offspring. Scientists believe that maritime earwigs practice this behavior in order to make their clutch maintain the size that best optimizes their investment. In this case, the mother will often eat the youngest child, which serves to shorten the total time she spends caring for the young. As she optimizes the childbearing process, the amount of energy she has to spend on her remaining children increases, as does their chance of survival.

== See also ==
- List of Dermapterans of Australia
