= Anisolabis hawaiiensis =

Scientific classification
- Domain: Eukaryota
- Kingdom: Animalia
- Phylum: Arthropoda
- Class: Insecta
- Order: Dermaptera
- Family: Anisolabididae
- Genus: Anisolabis
- Species: A. hawaiiensis

Binomial name
- Anisolabis hawaiiensis Brindle, 1979

Species of earwig

Anisolabis hawaiiensis is a species of earwig in the genus Anisolabis, the family Anisolabididae, and the order Dermaptera. The species is native to Hawaii, and was first classified by Brindle in 1979.
