= Aborolabis pervicina =

Scientific classification
- Domain: Eukaryota
- Kingdom: Animalia
- Phylum: Arthropoda
- Class: Insecta
- Order: Dermaptera
- Family: Anisolabididae
- Genus: Aborolabis
- Species: A. pervicina

Binomial name
- Aborolabis pervicina Burr, 1913

Species of earwig

Aborolabis pervicina is a species of earwig in the genus Aborolabis, the family Anisolabididae, and the order Dermaptera. Found primarily in the Indomalayan realm, this species was first classified by Burr in 1913.
