= Aborolabis angulifera =

Scientific classification
- Domain: Eukaryota
- Kingdom: Animalia
- Phylum: Arthropoda
- Class: Insecta
- Order: Dermaptera
- Family: Anisolabididae
- Genus: Aborolabis
- Species: A. angulifera

Binomial name
- Aborolabis angulifera Dohrn, 1864

Species of earwig

Aborolabis angulifera is a species of earwig in the genus Aborolabis, the family Anisolabididae, and the order Dermaptera. Primarily found in the Afrotropical realm, this species was discovered by Dohrn in 1864.
