= Aborolabis rufocapitata =

Scientific classification
- Domain: Eukaryota
- Kingdom: Animalia
- Phylum: Arthropoda
- Class: Insecta
- Order: Dermaptera
- Family: Anisolabididae
- Genus: Aborolabis
- Species: A. rufocapitata

Binomial name
- Aborolabis rufocapitata Steinmann, 1984

Species of earwig

Aborolabis rufocapitata is a species of earwig in the genus Aborolabis, the family Anisolabididae, and the order Dermaptera.
