= Euenkrates elegans =

Scientific classification
- Domain: Eukaryota
- Kingdom: Animalia
- Phylum: Arthropoda
- Class: Insecta
- Order: Dermaptera
- Family: Chelisochidae
- Genus: Euenkrates
- Species: E. elegans

Binomial name
- Euenkrates elegans (De Bormans, 1900) [Srivastava 1976]

Synonyms
- Chelisoches elegans De Bormans, 1900; Enkrates burri Boeseman, 1954 (as variety of elegans); Enkrates inermis Boeseman, 1954 (as variety of elegans); Apterygida lingua Burr, 1902

Species of earwig

Euenkrates elegans is a species of earwigs in the family Chelisochidae. It is found in Sumatra and Java.
