= Aborolabis mordax =

Scientific classification
- Domain: Eukaryota
- Kingdom: Animalia
- Phylum: Arthropoda
- Class: Insecta
- Order: Dermaptera
- Family: Anisolabididae
- Genus: Aborolabis
- Species: A. mordax

Binomial name
- Aborolabis mordax Steinmann, 1978

Species of earwig

Aborolabis mordax is a species of earwig in the genus Aborolabis, the family Anisolabididae, and the order Dermaptera. Found primarily in the Palearctic realm, this species was first classified by Henrik Steinmann in 1978.
