= Aborolabis martensi =

Scientific classification
- Domain: Eukaryota
- Kingdom: Animalia
- Phylum: Arthropoda
- Class: Insecta
- Order: Dermaptera
- Family: Anisolabididae
- Genus: Aborolabis
- Species: A. martensi

Binomial name
- Aborolabis martensi Brindle, 1987

Species of earwig

Aborolabis martensi is a species of earwig in the genus Aborolabis, the family Anisolabididae, and the order Dermaptera.
