= Aborolabis cerrobarjai =

Scientific classification
- Domain: Eukaryota
- Kingdom: Animalia
- Phylum: Arthropoda
- Class: Insecta
- Order: Dermaptera
- Family: Anisolabididae
- Genus: Aborolabis
- Species: A. cerrobarjai

Binomial name
- Aborolabis cerrobarjai Steinmann, 1979

Species of earwig

Aborolabis cerrobarjai is a species of earwig in the genus Aborolabis, the family Anisolabididae, and the order Dermaptera.
