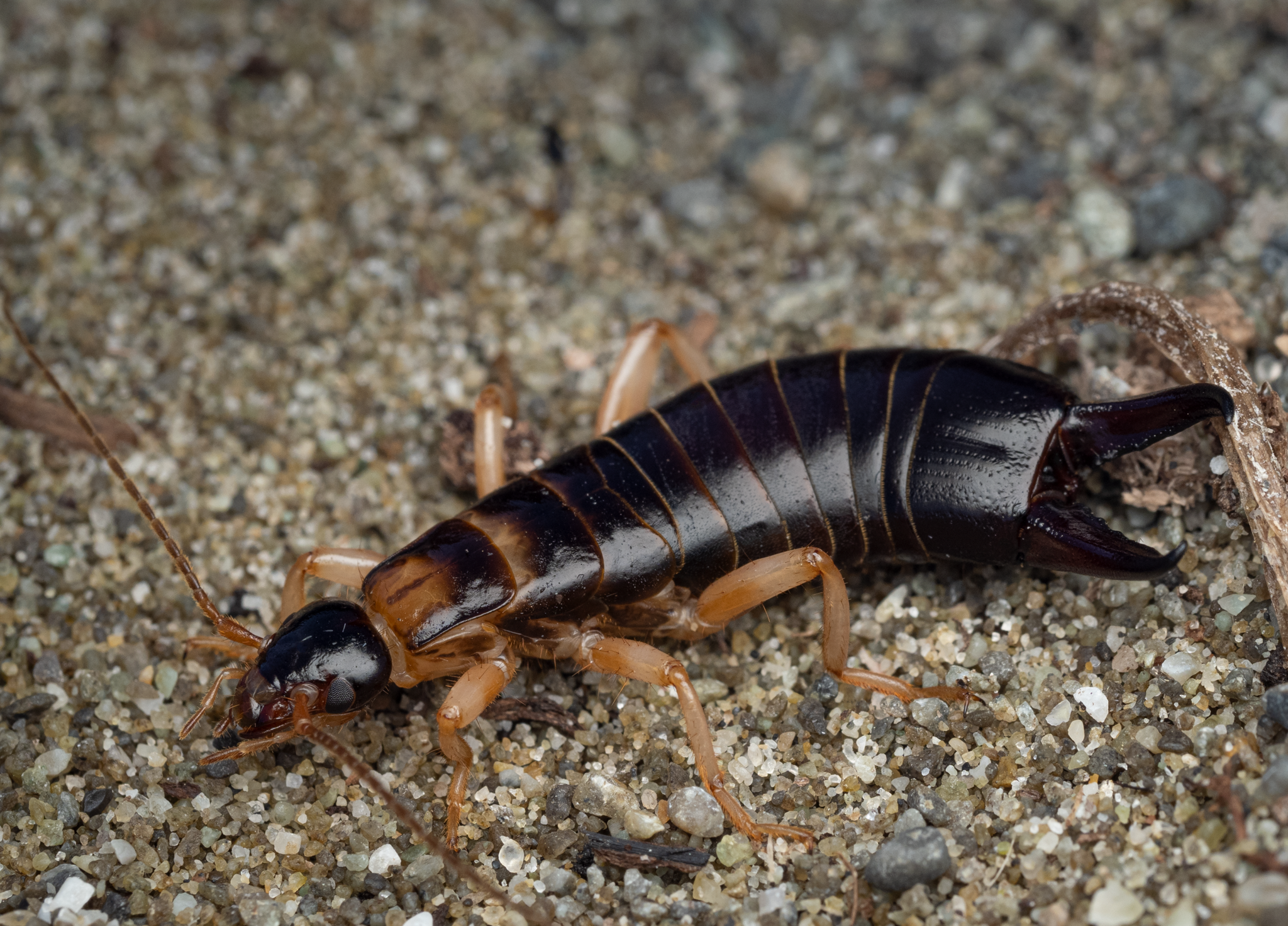

Scientific classification
- Domain: Eukaryota
- Kingdom: Animalia
- Phylum: Arthropoda
- Class: Insecta
- Order: Dermaptera
- Family: Anisolabididae
- Genus: Anisolabis
- Species: A. littorea

Binomial name
- Anisolabis littorea (White, 1846)

Synonyms
- Forficula littorea White, 1846

= Seashore earwig =

Species of earwig

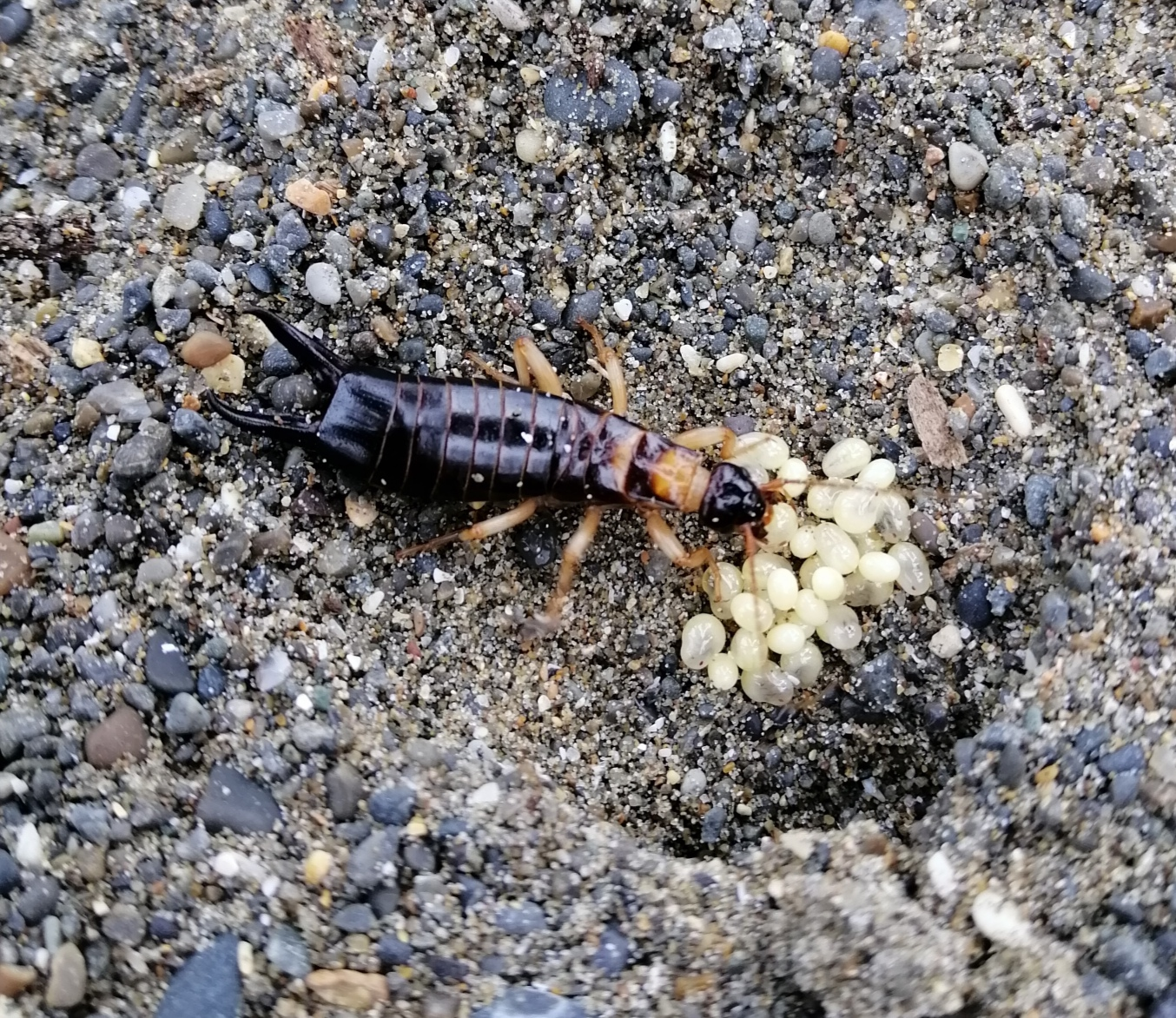
A. littorea with eggs

Anisolabis littorea (Māori: mata), commonly known as the seashore earwig, is a species of earwig in the family Anisolabididae. This species is said to be endemic to New Zealand but other publications state the species is also found in New South Wales, Queensland and Tasmania.

== Taxonomy ==
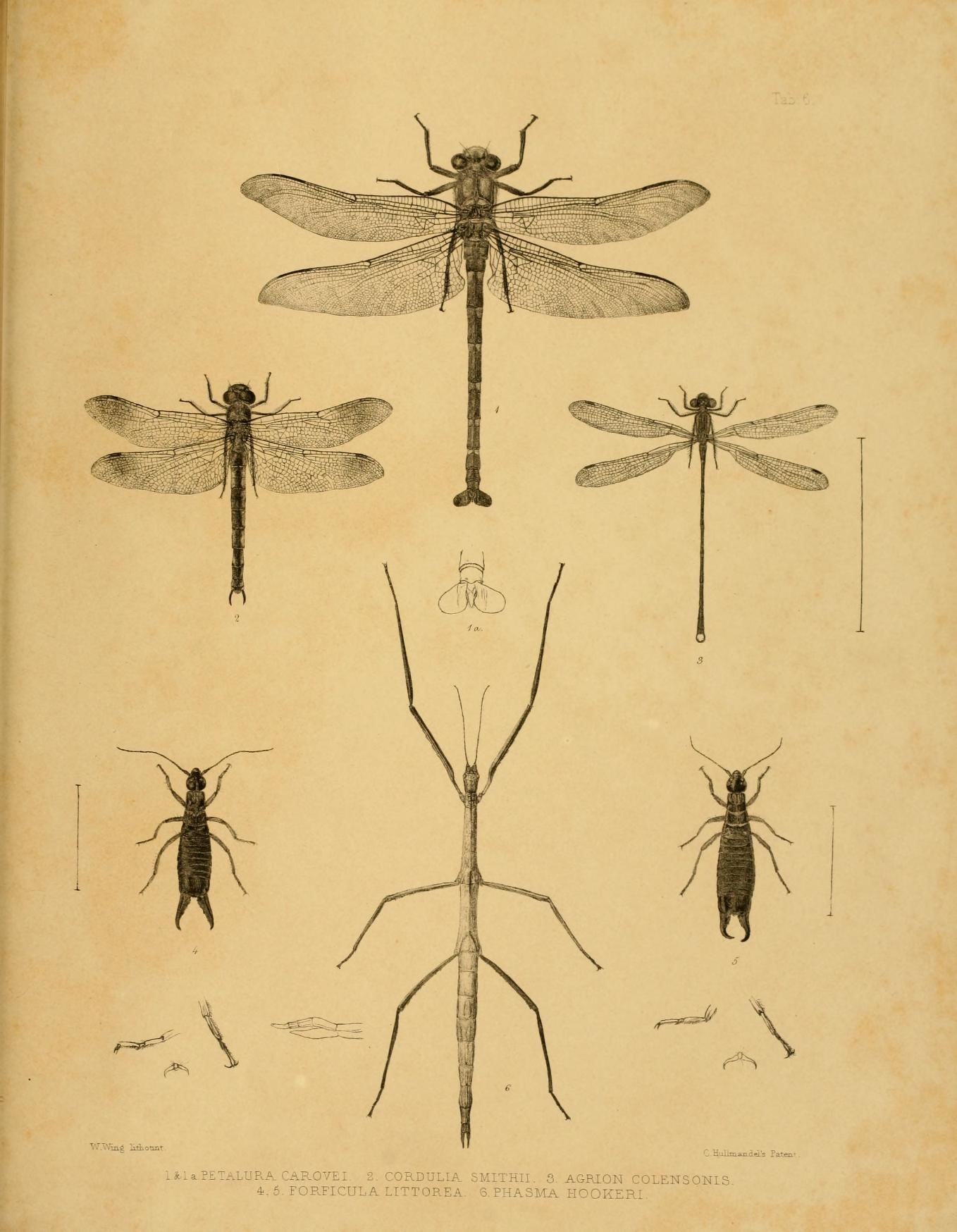
Illustrations accompanying the first description of A. littorea.

The species was first described in 1846 by Adam White and originally named Forficula littorea. The type specimen of this species is held at the Natural History Museum, London.

== Description ==
White in his original description of the species described it as follows:

Deep blackish brown, with fulvous legs; head somewhat triangular, the sides behind the eyes rounded, very deep blackish brown; labrum, cibarial organs and antennae fulvo-testaceous; two fulvous spots on the head, one close to the inside of each eye, a short, fulvous line on the middle of the hind part; antennae with at least nineteen joints, first joint the longest, second very short, third three times the length of second, fourth a little longer than the second, the others gradually increasing in length; prothorax square, fulvous in front, with a short, impressed line in the middle; abdomen widest about the seventh joint, deep blackish brown, the margins slightly fulvous, last segment of abdomen large, with some wide, longitudinal lines above, the forceps short, slightly hooked at the end, with two or three sinuations on the inner edge; legs fulvous, tarsi without apparent pads. Apterous.

This species has a blackish-brown body about 35mm long, with brown-yellow legs. It has two light brown spots on its head, close to the inside of each eye. Its abdomen is widest at the seventh segment. It is flightless.

== Distribution ==
This species is said to be endemic to New Zealand. However other publications state that the species is also found in New South Wales, Queensland and Tasmania.

== Habitat and ecology ==
Similar both ecologically and taxonomically to the maritime earwig, this species is commonly found on beaches under stones and debris. It is a carnivore, feeding on millipedes, flies, and isopods such as woodlice. Like most other earwigs, the females care for their young during development, and the larva go through five instars before becoming adults.

== Behaviour ==
The species also has a negative phototaxis, meaning that it tends to move away from a light source.
