= Aborolabis vicina =

Scientific classification
- Domain: Eukaryota
- Kingdom: Animalia
- Phylum: Arthropoda
- Class: Insecta
- Order: Dermaptera
- Family: Anisolabididae
- Genus: Aborolabis
- Species: A. vicina

Binomial name
- Aborolabis vicina Burr, 1911

Species of earwig

Aborolabis vicina is a species of earwig in the genus Aborolabis, the family Anisolabididae, and the order Dermaptera. Found primarily in the Afrotropical realm, this species was first classified by Burr in 1911.
