= A. nepalensis =

A. nepalensis may refer to:

- Aborolabis nepalensis, an earwig with unsegmented cerci
- Acanthocalyx nepalensis, a plant native to China
- Adonis nepalensis, an Old World plant
- Agrilus nepalensis, a jewel beetle
- Alhagi nepalensis, a manna tree
- Alnus nepalensis, an alder tree
- Amara nepalensis, a sun beetle
- Amaranthus nepalensis, an annual plant
- Anchista nepalensis, synonym for Anchista fenestrata, a ground beetle
- Ancistria nepalensis, a parasitic flat bark beetle
- Anguliphantes nepalensis, a sheet weaver
- Antrocephalus nepalensis, a thallose liverwort
- Aparupa nepalensis, a ground beetle
- Arctodiaptomus nepalensis, a pelagic copepod
- Arcyria nepalensis, a slime mold
- Arundinella nepalensis, a true grass
- Asymblepharus nepalensis, a scaled reptile
- Attagenus nepalensis, a skin beetle
- Attheyella nepalensis, a benthic copepod
