= Anisolabis oahuensis =

Scientific classification
- Domain: Eukaryota
- Kingdom: Animalia
- Phylum: Arthropoda
- Class: Insecta
- Order: Dermaptera
- Family: Anisolabididae
- Genus: Anisolabis
- Species: A. oahuensis

Binomial name
- Anisolabis oahuensis Brindle, 1979

Species of earwig

Anisolabis oahuensis is a species of earwig in the genus Anisolabis, the family Anisolabididae, and the order Dermaptera.
