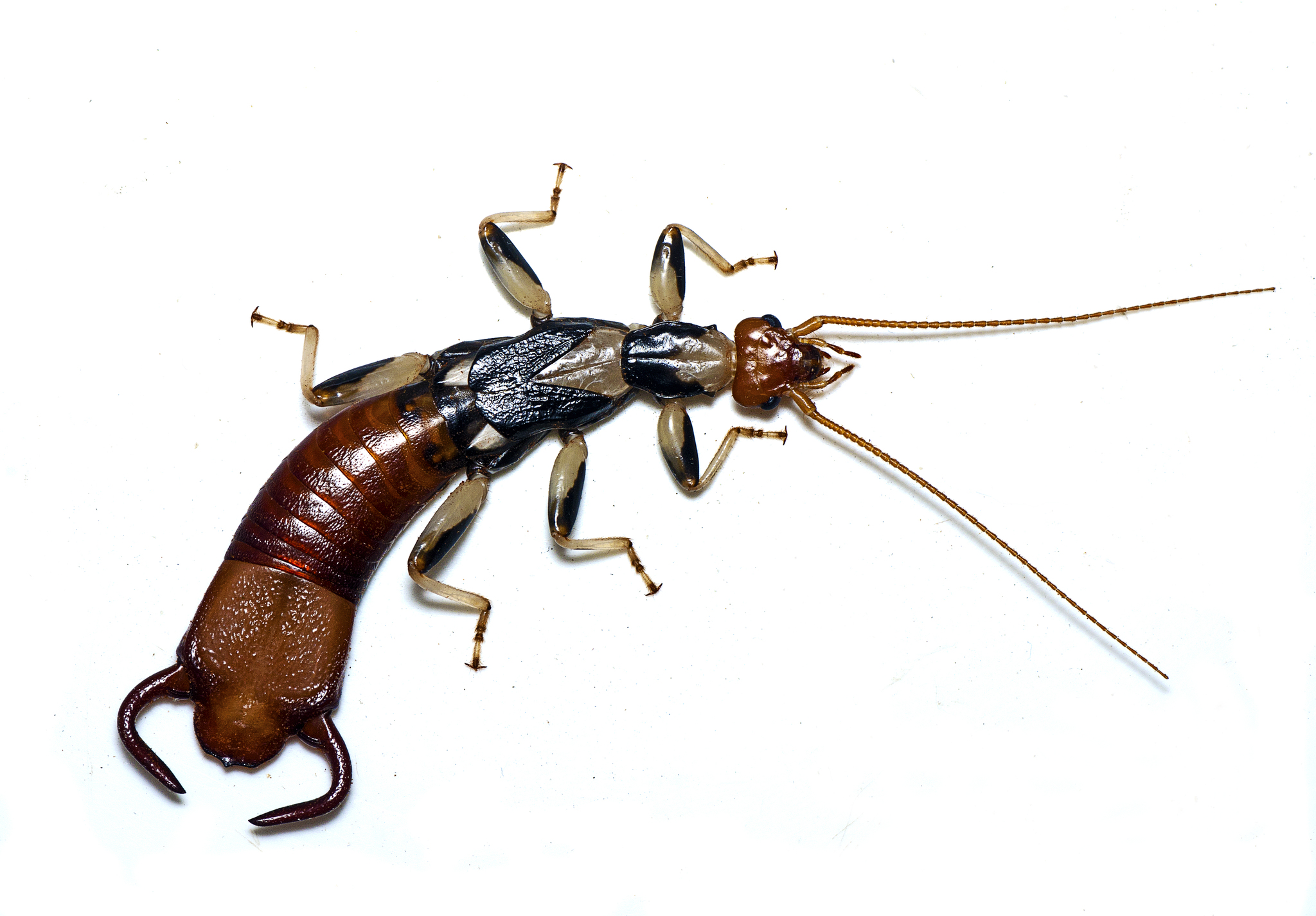

Scientific classification
- Domain: Eukaryota
- Kingdom: Animalia
- Phylum: Arthropoda
- Class: Insecta
- Order: Dermaptera
- Family: Apachyidae
- Subfamily: Apachyinae
- Genus: Apachyus; Audinet-Serville, 1831

= Apachyus =

Genus of earwigs

Apachyus is one of the two genera of earwigs in the family Apachyidae.
