= Mongolabis =

Scientific classification
- Domain: Eukaryota
- Kingdom: Animalia
- Phylum: Arthropoda
- Class: Insecta
- Order: Dermaptera
- Family: Anisolabididae
- Subfamily: Anisolabidinae
- Genus: Mongolabis; Zacher, 1911

Genus of earwigs

Mongolabis is a genus of earwigs in the subfamily Anisolabidinae. It was cited by Srivastava in Part 2 of Fauna of India.
