= Lobophora =

Lobophora may refer to:

- Lobophora (moth), a genus of moths
- Lobophora (alga), a genus of brown algae
- a synonym for Chelisoches, a genus of earwigs
