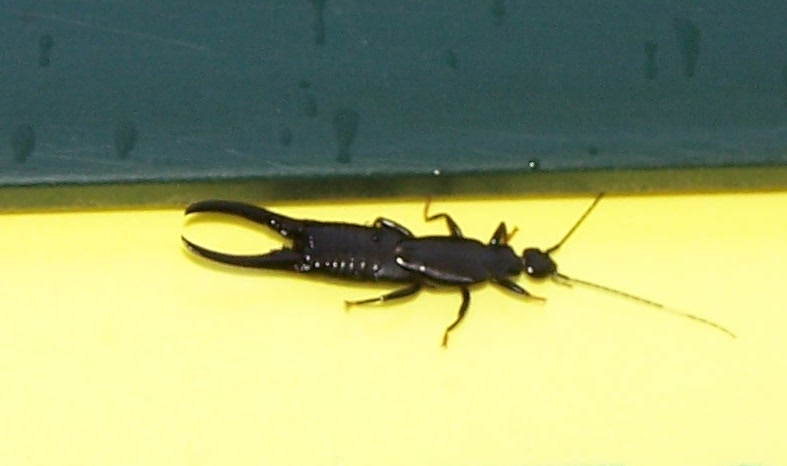
- A black earwig (Chelisoches morio) on a sign in Hawaii Botanical Garden

Scientific classification
- Domain: Eukaryota
- Kingdom: Animalia
- Phylum: Arthropoda
- Class: Insecta
- Order: Dermaptera
- Family: Chelisochidae
- Subfamily: Chelisochinae; Burr, 1907

Genera
- See text

= Chelisochinae =

Subfamily of earwigs

Chelisochinae is a subfamily of earwigs in the family Chelisochidae.

== Species ==
This subfamily includes the following genera:

- Adiathella Brindle, 1970
- Adiathetus Burr, 1907
- Chelisoches Scudder, 1876
- Euenkrates Rehn, 1927
- Exypnus Burr, 1907
- Gressitolabis Brindle, 1970
- Hamaxas Burr, 1907
- Lamprophorella Mjöberg, 1924
- Proreus Burr, 1907
- Schizochelisoches Steinmann, 1987
- Schizoproreus Steinmann, 1987
- Solenosoma Burr, 1907
