= Apachyidae =

Scientific classification
- Kingdom: Animalia
- Phylum: Arthropoda
- Class: Insecta
- Order: Dermaptera
- Suborder: Neodermaptera
- Infraorder: Epidermaptera
- Superfamily: Apachyoidea; Verhoeff, 1902
- Family: Apachyidae; Verhoeff, 1902
- Subfamily: Apachyinae; Verhoeff, 1902

Genera
- See text

Family of earwigs

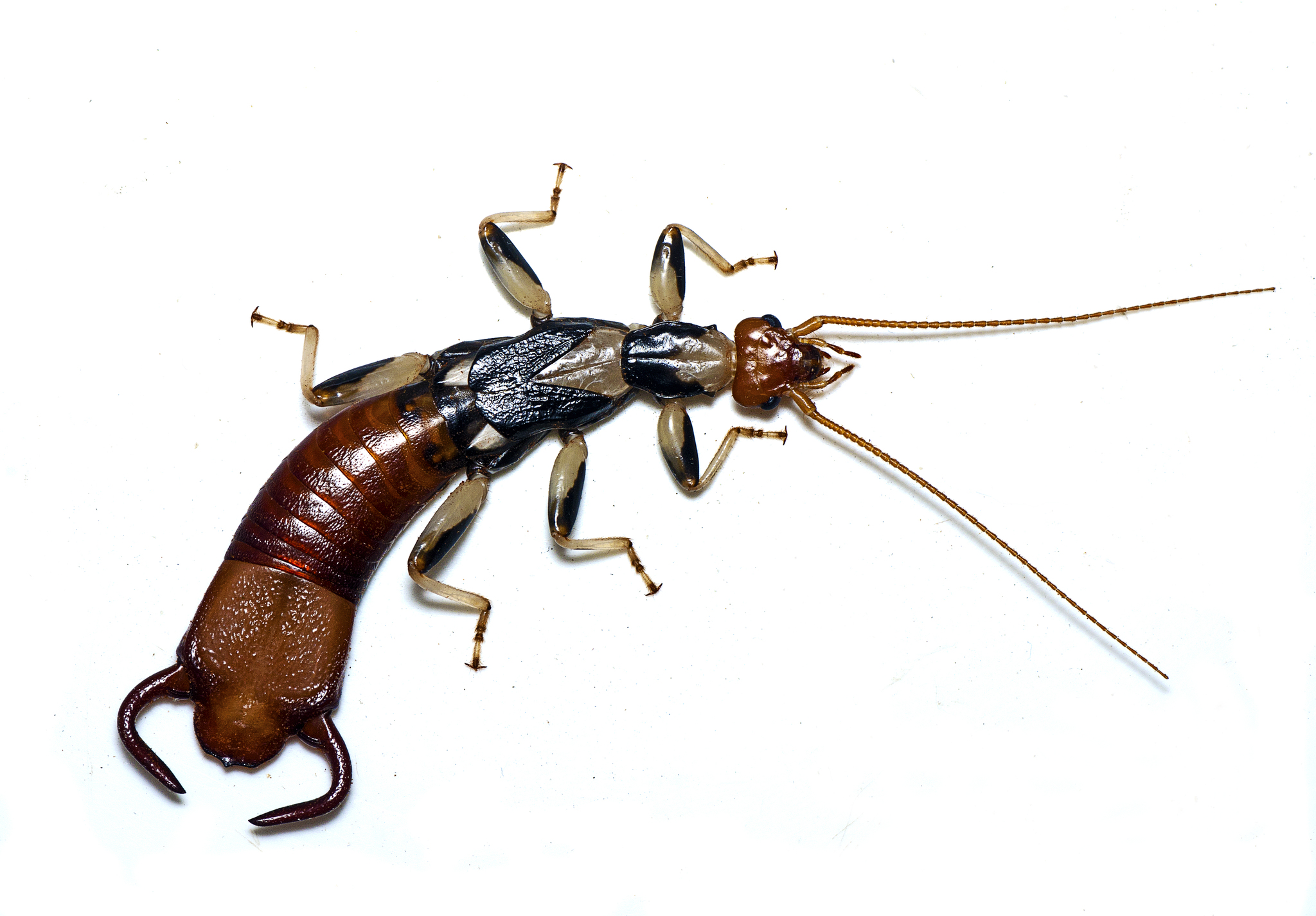
A photo of Apachyus peterseni

Apachyidae is a small family of earwigs, in the suborder Neodermaptera and the order Dermaptera. It contains two genera (placed in one subfamily, Apachyinae).

== Genera ==
- Apachyus Audinet-Serville, 1831
- Dendroiketes Burr, 1909
