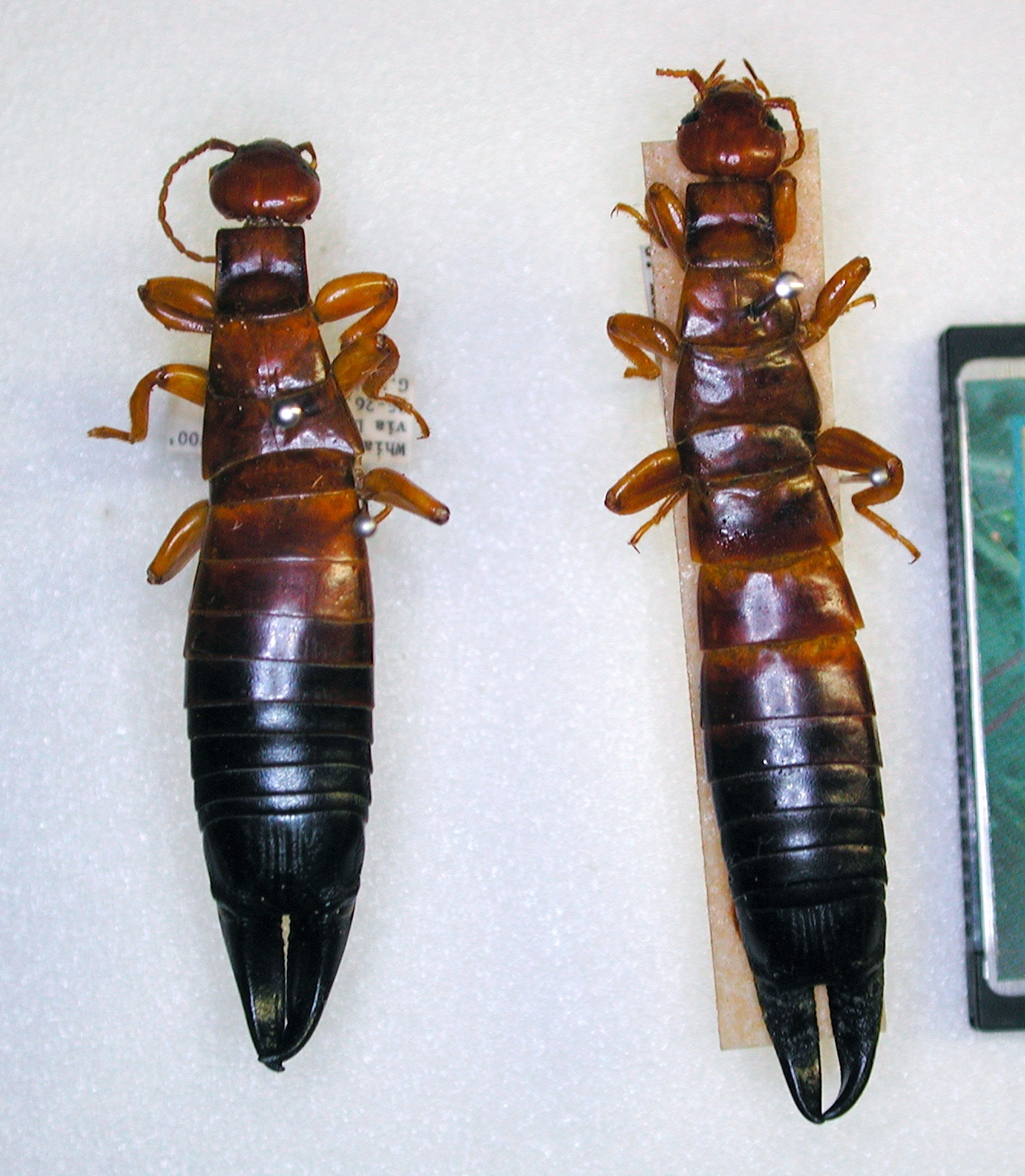
- Titanolabis colossea

Scientific classification
- Domain: Eukaryota
- Kingdom: Animalia
- Phylum: Arthropoda
- Class: Insecta
- Order: Dermaptera
- Family: Anisolabididae
- Subfamily: Titanolabidinae
- Genus: Titanolabis; Burr, 1910

Species
- See text

= Titanolabis =

Genus of earwigs

Titanolabis is a genus of earwigs in the subfamily Titanolabidinae. Among its species is the Australian T. colossea, which at about 5 cm (2.0 in) long is the largest certainly living species of earwig (the even larger Saint Helena earwig, Labidura herculeana, is generally considered extinct).

== Species ==
- Titanolabis bormansi Srivastava, 1983
- Titanolabis centaurea Steinmann, 1985
- Titanolabis colossea (Dohrn, 1864)
- Titanolabis maindroni (Borelli, 1911)
- Titanolabis orientalis (Ramamurthi, 1968)
