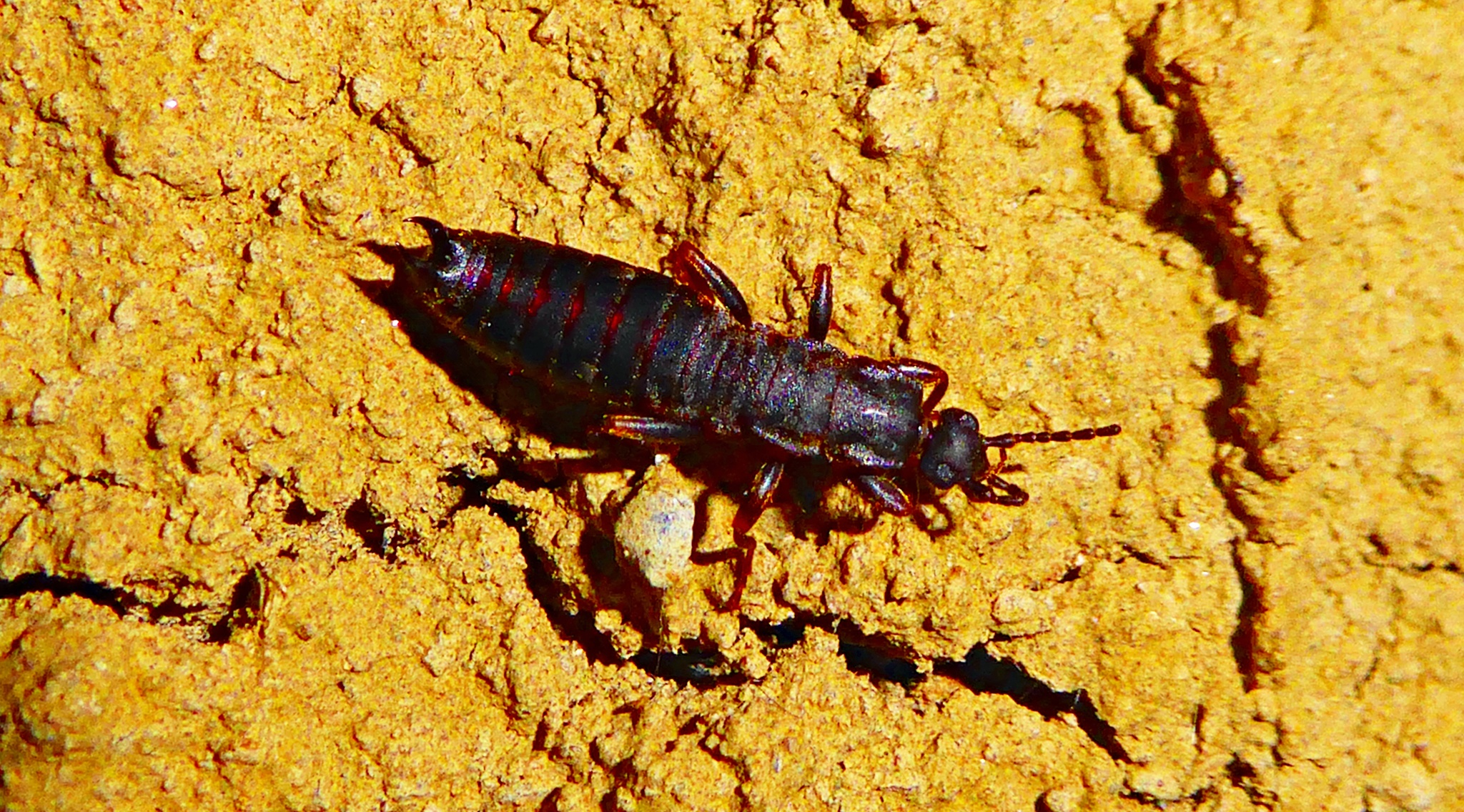
- Ctenisolabis nigra

Scientific classification
- Domain: Eukaryota
- Kingdom: Animalia
- Phylum: Arthropoda
- Class: Insecta
- Order: Dermaptera
- Family: Anisolabididae
- Subfamily: Brachylabidinae
- Genus: Ctenisolabis; Verhoeff, 1902

Species
- See text

= Ctenisolabis =

Genus of earwigs

Ctenisolabis is a genus of earwigs in the subfamily Brachylabidinae.

== Species ==
- Ctenisolabis aciculata Steinmann, 1983
- Ctenisolabis fletcheri Burr, 1910
- Ctenisolabis loebli Steinmann, 1983
- Ctenisolabis mahunkai Steinmann, 1978
- Ctenisolabis montana (Borelli, 1909)
- Ctenisolabis nigra (Scudder, 1876)
- Ctenisolabis pusilla Steinmann, 1978
- Ctenisolabis ruficollis (Hincks, 1957)
- Ctenisolabis togoensis Verhoeff, 1902
- Ctenisolabis traegaordhi (Burr, 1913)
