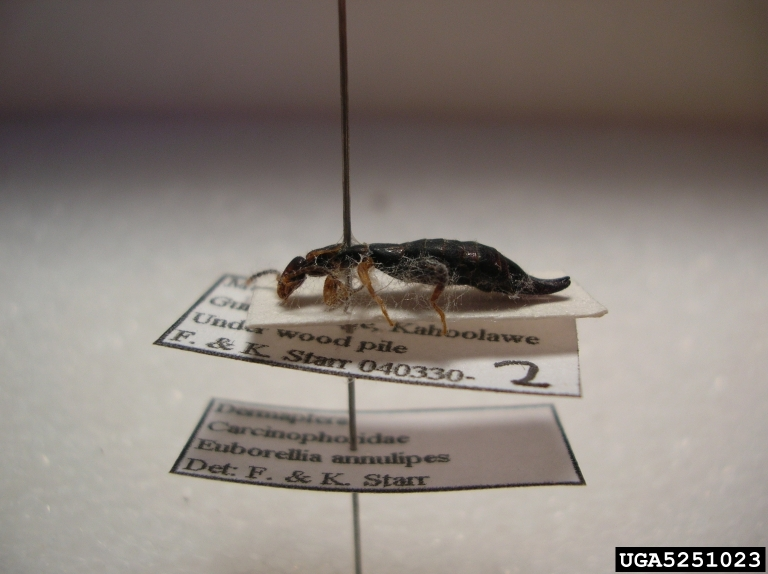
- Euborellia annulipes, or ringlegged earwig

Scientific classification
- Domain: Eukaryota
- Kingdom: Animalia
- Phylum: Arthropoda
- Class: Insecta
- Order: Dermaptera
- Suborder: Neodermaptera
- Infraorder: Epidermaptera
- Superfamily: Anisolabidoidea
- Family: Anisolabididae
- Subfamily: Anisolabidinae; Verhoeff, 1902

Synonyms
- Carcinophoridae Hincks, 1954; Carcinophorinae Hincks, 1954; Gonolabidae Verhoeff, 1902; Gonolabiinae Verhoeff, 1902; Placolabidinae Srivastava, 1999

= Anisolabidinae =

Subfamily of earwigs

Anisolabidinae, alternatively known as Carcinophorinae, Gonolabiinae, or Placolabidinae, is a subfamily of earwigs containing 17 genera.

== Genera ==
- Aborolabis
- Anisolabis
- Canarilabis
- Carcinophora
- Epilandex
- Euborellia
- Flexiolabis
- Gonolabis
- Indolabis
- Mongolabis
- Neolabis
- Ornatolabis
- Paraflexiolabis
- Placolabis
- Socotralabis
- Thekalabis
- Zacheria
