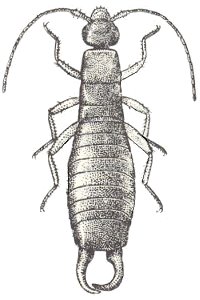
- Anisolabis maritima, commonly known as the maritime earwig or the seaside earwig.

Scientific classification
- Domain: Eukaryota
- Kingdom: Animalia
- Phylum: Arthropoda
- Class: Insecta
- Order: Dermaptera
- Family: Anisolabididae
- Subfamily: Anisolabidinae
- Genus: Anisolabis; Fieber, 1853

Species
- See text

= Anisolabis =

Genus of earwigs

Anisolabis is a genus of mostly Asian earwigs in the subfamily Anisolabidinae. It was cited by Srivastava in Part 2 of Fauna of India. The name Anisolabis stems from the asymmetry of the male cerci; the right cercus being more acute than the left.

== Species ==
The Dermaptera Species File lists:

- species group based on Anisolabis interjacens Anisyutkin, 1998
- species group based on Anisolabis papulosus Anisyutkin, 1998
- species group based on Anisolabis spiniger Anisyutkin, 1998
- no species group assigned
1. Anisolabis aborensis (Burr, 1913)
2. Anisolabis acutiventris (Hincks, 1954)
3. Anisolabis alata Johnsen, 1974
4. Anisolabis ambigua Borelli, 1906
5. Anisolabis atra Borelli, 1907
6. Anisolabis australis Tindale, 1923
7. Anisolabis baloghi Steinmann, 1979
8. Anisolabis bifida Brindle, 1970
9. Anisolabis bintumanensis Brindle, 1971
10. Anisolabis boninensis Nishikawa, 2013
11. Anisolabis breviforceps Brindle, 1980
12. Anisolabis brindlei Capra, 1978
13. Anisolabis burri (Zacher, 1911)
14. Anisolabis caesarea (Zacher, 1911)
15. Anisolabis canaca Brindle, 1976
16. Anisolabis cristata (Hincks, 1954)
17. Anisolabis cunicula Brindle, 1978
18. Anisolabis decorata Anisyutkin, 2004
19. Anisolabis deplanata Srivastava, 1985
20. Anisolabis diabolo Steinmann, 1989
21. Anisolabis diana Steinmann, 1988
22. Anisolabis dohrni (Zacher, 1911)
23. Anisolabis dubronyi Kirby, 1903
24. Anisolabis duplicata Steinmann, 1989
25. Anisolabis elongata Brindle, 1978
26. Anisolabis excisa Bey-Bienko, 1959
27. Anisolabis felix Burr, 1907
28. Anisolabis flavocapitata Steinmann, 1979
29. Anisolabis gaudens Burr, 1904
30. Anisolabis gestri Borelli, 1907
31. Anisolabis greeni Burr, 1899
32. Anisolabis guineensis Bivar de Souza & Sakai, 1996
33. Anisolabis hawaiiensis Brindle, 1980
34. Anisolabis henriki (Srivastava, 1987)
35. Anisolabis horvathi Burr, 1912
36. Anisolabis hottentotta (Dohrn, 1867)
37. Anisolabis howarthi Brindle, 1980
38. Anisolabis incisa Borelli, 1914
39. Anisolabis incisoides Brindle, 1978
40. Anisolabis infelix Burr, 1907
41. Anisolabis infernalis (Burr, 1913)
42. Anisolabis isomorpha Borelli, 1907
43. Anisolabis jaenneli (Menozzi, 1938)
44. Anisolabis kaspar Hudson, 1973
45. Anisolabis kristenseni Burr, 1911
46. Anisolabis kudagae Burr, 1901
47. Anisolabis laeta (Gerstaecker, 1869)
48. Anisolabis laevis (Borelli, 1921)
49. Anisolabis lamottei Brindle, 1971
50. Anisolabis lefroyi (Burr, 1910)
51. Anisolabis littorea (White, 1846)
52. Anisolabis magna Bey-Bienko, 1959
53. Anisolabis maritima (Bonelli, 1832)
54. Anisolabis mauiensis Brindle, 1980
55. Anisolabis minutissima Brindle, 1972
56. Anisolabis modesta Steinmann, 1979
57. Anisolabis montshadskii Bey-Bienko, 1959
58. Anisolabis neavei Brindle, 1978
59. Anisolabis nigrofusca Steinmann, 1979
60. Anisolabis nimbaensis Hincks, 1954
61. Anisolabis oahuensis Brindle, 1980
62. Anisolabis oweni Burr, 1911
63. Anisolabis pacifica (Erichson, 1842)
64. Anisolabis pagana Burr, 1915
65. Anisolabis pectoralis (Eschscholz, 1822)
66. Anisolabis penetrans Burr, 1912
67. Anisolabis perissa Günther, 1929
68. Anisolabis pilosa Steinmann, 1979
69. Anisolabis pluto Rehn, 1905
70. Anisolabis porrectella Brindle, 1978
71. Anisolabis punctulata Brindle, 1978
72. Anisolabis quadricollis (Hincks, 1954)
73. Anisolabis quarens Burr, 1915
74. Anisolabis recurva Borelli, 1915
75. Anisolabis rhombus Popham, 1983
76. Anisolabis robustus (Dubrony, 1879)
77. Anisolabis rossi (Srivastava, 1990)
78. Anisolabis rostrata Brindle, 1978
79. Anisolabis rougemonti Brindle, 1978
80. Anisolabis royi Brindle, 1971
81. Anisolabis rubella Brindle, 1977
82. Anisolabis rufescens Kirby, 1891
83. Anisolabis rugosa Brindle, 1971
84. Anisolabis ryukyuensis (Nishikawa, 1969)
85. Anisolabis sarasini (Burr, 1914)
86. Anisolabis scotti Brindle, 1978
87. Anisolabis seirokui Nishikawa, 2008
88. Anisolabis simiensis Brindle, 1978
89. Anisolabis spatula Brindle, 1978
90. Anisolabis straeleni (Hincks, 1955)
91. Anisolabis subarmata (Kirby, 1900)
92. Anisolabis tatei Srivastava, 1983
93. Anisolabis tegminata Caudell, 1927
94. Anisolabis tumida Borelli, 1907
95. Anisolabis turgida Burr, 1911
96. Anisolabis verhoeffi Zacher, 1911
97. Anisolabis vitalisi Burr, 1917
98. Anisolabis vosseleri Burr, 1907
99. Anisolabis westralica Burr, 1911
