= Gonolabina =

Scientific classification
- Domain: Eukaryota
- Kingdom: Animalia
- Phylum: Arthropoda
- Class: Insecta
- Order: Dermaptera
- Family: Anisolabididae
- Subfamily: Gonolabininae; Popham & Brindle, 1966
- Genus: Gonolabina; Verhoeff, 1902

Genus of earwigs

Gonolabina is a genus of earwigs in the subfamily Gonolabininae.
