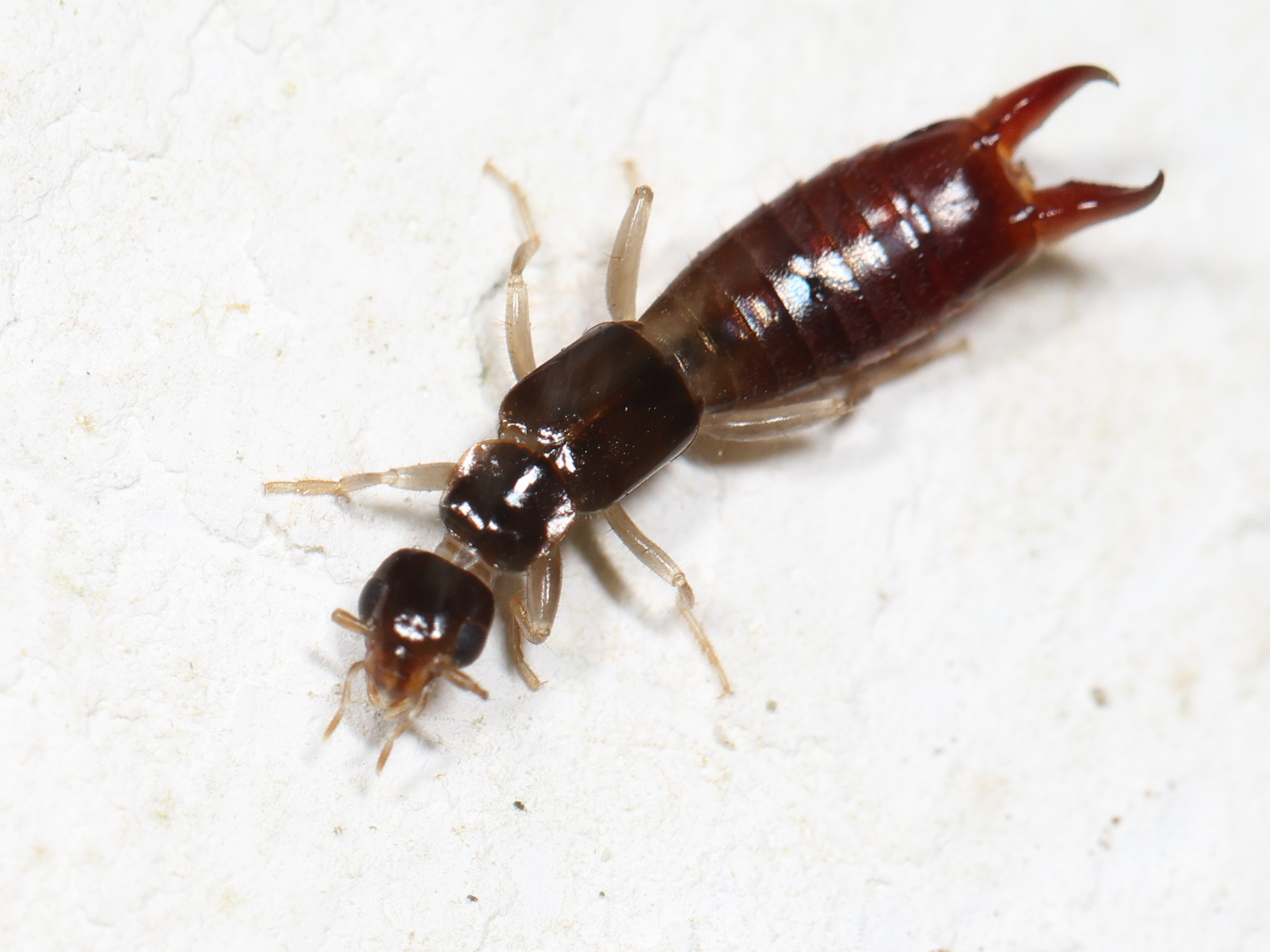
- Epilandex peterseni

Scientific classification
- Kingdom: Animalia
- Phylum: Arthropoda
- Clade: Pancrustacea
- Class: Insecta
- Order: Dermaptera
- Family: Anisolabididae
- Subfamily: Anisolabidinae
- Genus: Epilandex; Hebard, 1927

= Epilandex =

Genus of earwigs

Epilandex is a genus of earwigs in the subfamily Anisolabidinae.
