= Ornatolabis =

Scientific classification
- Domain: Eukaryota
- Kingdom: Animalia
- Phylum: Arthropoda
- Class: Insecta
- Order: Dermaptera
- Family: Anisolabididae
- Subfamily: Anisolabidinae
- Genus: Ornatolabis; Steinmann, 1989
- Species: O. externa

Binomial name
- Ornatolabis externa (Bey-Bienko, 1959)

Genus of earwigs

Ornatolabis is a monotypic genus of earwigs in the subfamily Anisolabidinae. It was cited by Steinmann in The Animal Kingdom. The only species is Ornatolabis externa.
