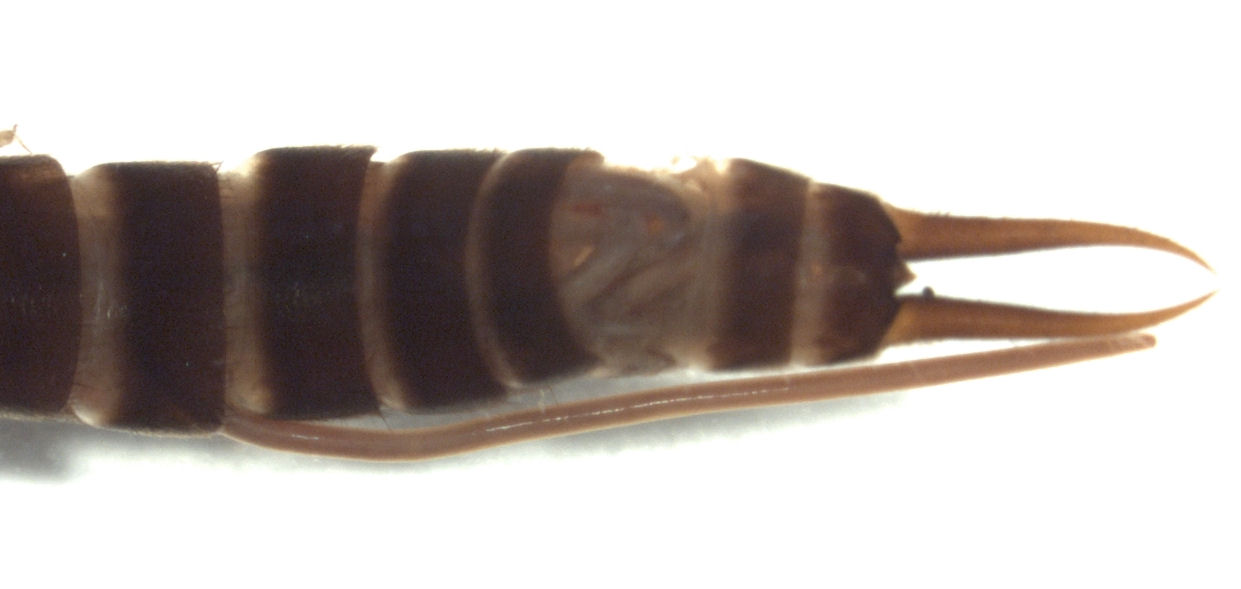

Scientific classification
- Domain: Eukaryota
- Kingdom: Animalia
- Phylum: Arthropoda
- Class: Insecta
- Order: Dermaptera
- Family: Anisolabididae
- Subfamily: Parisolabidinae; Verhoeff, 1904

Genera
- see text

= Parisolabidinae =

Subfamily of earwigs

Parisolabidinae is a subfamily of earwigs, and contains two genera.

== Genera ==
- Parisolabis Verhoeff, 1904
- Parisopsalis Burr, 1914
