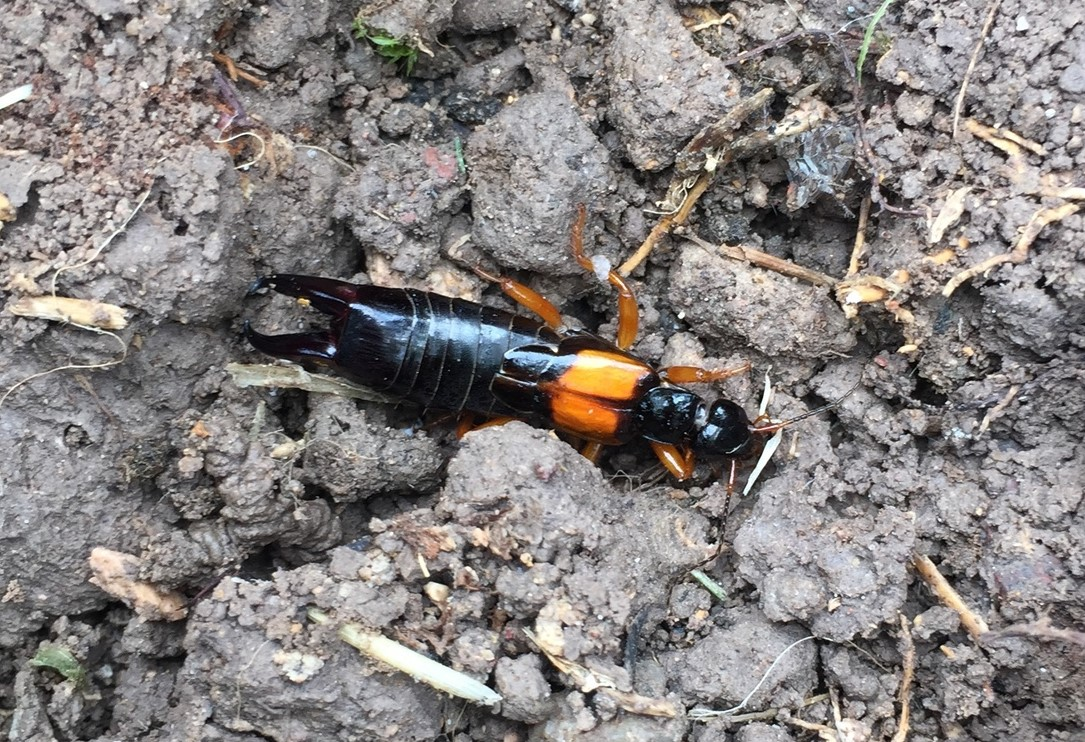
- Carcinophora americana

Scientific classification
- Domain: Eukaryota
- Kingdom: Animalia
- Phylum: Arthropoda
- Class: Insecta
- Order: Dermaptera
- Family: Anisolabididae
- Subfamily: Anisolabidinae
- Genus: Carcinophora; Scudder, 1876

= Carcinophora =

Genus of earwigs

Carcinophora is a genus of earwigs in the subfamily Anisolabidinae.
