= Indolabis =

Scientific classification
- Domain: Eukaryota
- Kingdom: Animalia
- Phylum: Arthropoda
- Class: Insecta
- Order: Dermaptera
- Family: Anisolabididae
- Subfamily: Anisolabidinae
- Genus: Indolabis; Steinmann, 1989
- Species: I. papua

Binomial name
- Indolabis papua Steinmann, 1989

Genus of earwigs

Indolabis is a monotypic genus of earwigs in the subfamily Anisolabidinae. It was cited by Steinmann in The Animal Kingdom. The only species is Indolabis papua.
