= Euenkrates =

Scientific classification
- Domain: Eukaryota
- Kingdom: Animalia
- Phylum: Arthropoda
- Class: Insecta
- Order: Dermaptera
- Family: Chelisochidae
- Subfamily: Chelisochinae
- Genus: Euenkrates; Rehn, 1927

Species
- See text

Genus of earwigs

Euenkrates is a genus of earwigs in the family Chelisochidae.

== Species ==
The genus includes the following species:

- Euenkrates boesemani Steinmann, 1981
- Euenkrates elegans (De Bormans, 1900)
- Euenkrates simplex Ramamurthi, 1967
- Euenkrates variegatum Kirby, 1891 [Rehn 1927]
