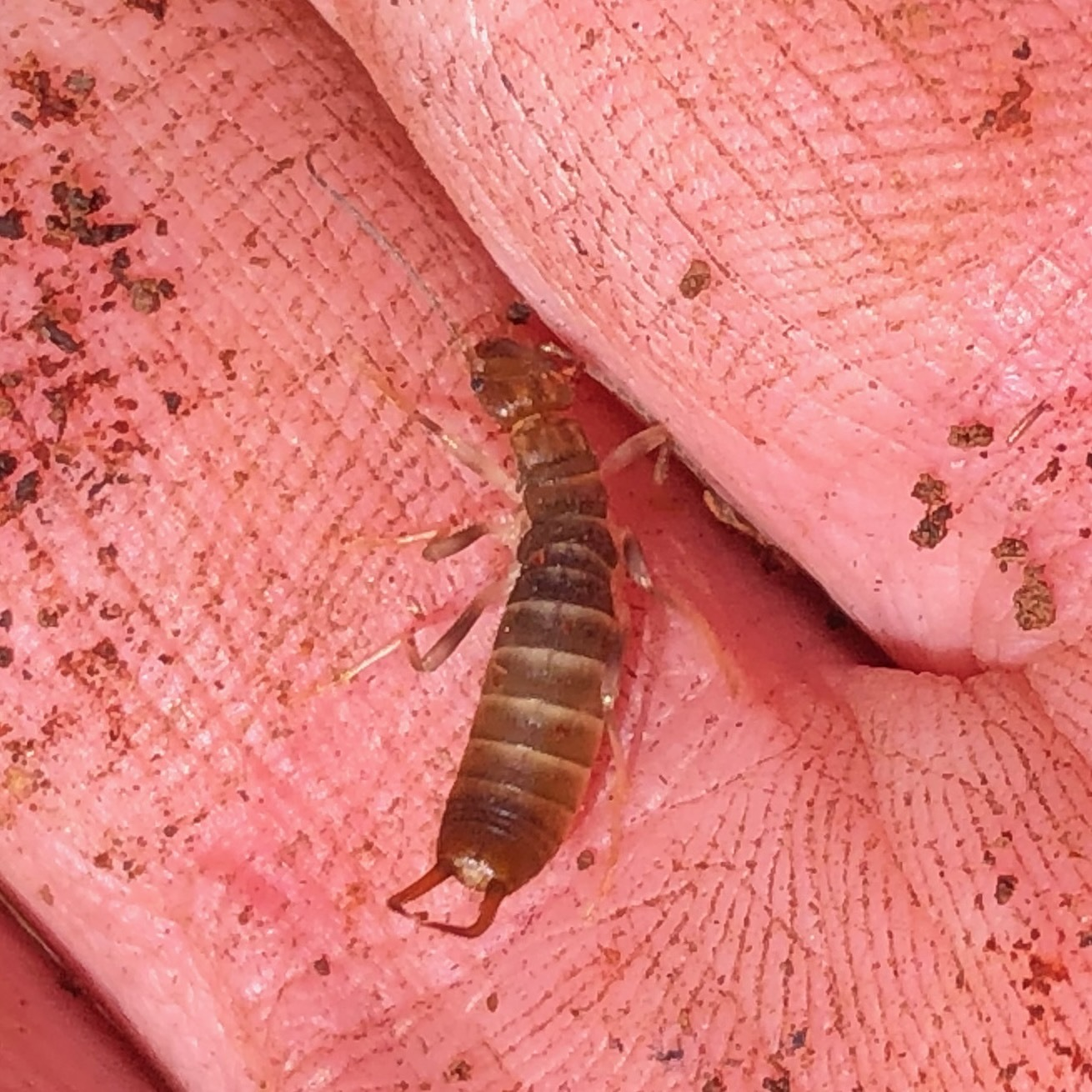
- Isolabis cavagnaroi

Scientific classification
- Domain: Eukaryota
- Kingdom: Animalia
- Phylum: Arthropoda
- Class: Insecta
- Order: Dermaptera
- Family: Anisolabididae
- Subfamily: Isolabidinae
- Genus: Isolabis; Verhoeff, 1902

= Isolabis =

Genus of earwigs

Isolabis is a genus of earwigs in the subfamily Isolabidinae.
