= Isolabidinae =

Scientific classification
- Domain: Eukaryota
- Kingdom: Animalia
- Phylum: Arthropoda
- Class: Insecta
- Order: Dermaptera
- Family: Anisolabididae
- Subfamily: Isolabidinae; Verhoeff, 1902

Genera
- see text

Subfamily of earwigs

Isolabidinae is a subfamily of earwigs, and contains four genera.

== Genera ==
- Africolabis Brindle, 1978
- Geracodes Hebard, 1917
- Isolabis Verhoeff, 1902
- Pterolabis Steinmann, 1989
