= Idolopsalis =

Scientific classification
- Domain: Eukaryota
- Kingdom: Animalia
- Phylum: Arthropoda
- Class: Insecta
- Order: Dermaptera
- Family: Anisolabididae
- Subfamily: Idolopsalidinae; Steinmann, 1975
- Genus: Idolopsalis; Borelli, 1910

Genus of earwigs

Idolopsalis is a genus of earwigs, the sole member of the subfamily Idolopsalidinae.
