= Geracodes =

Scientific classification
- Domain: Eukaryota
- Kingdom: Animalia
- Phylum: Arthropoda
- Class: Insecta
- Order: Dermaptera
- Family: Anisolabididae
- Subfamily: Isolabidinae
- Genus: Geracodes; Hebard, 1917

Genus of earwigs

Geracodes is a genus of earwigs in the subfamily Isolabidinae.
