= Dendroiketes =

Scientific classification
- Domain: Eukaryota
- Kingdom: Animalia
- Phylum: Arthropoda
- Class: Insecta
- Order: Dermaptera
- Family: Apachyidae
- Subfamily: Apachyinae
- Genus: Dendroiketes; Burr, 1909

Genus of earwigs

Dendroiketes is a genus of earwigs, in the family Apachyidae. It is one of only two genera in Apachyidae.
