= Pterolabis =

Scientific classification
- Domain: Eukaryota
- Kingdom: Animalia
- Phylum: Arthropoda
- Class: Insecta
- Order: Dermaptera
- Family: Anisolabididae
- Subfamily: Isolabidinae
- Genus: Pterolabis; Steinmann, 1989
- Species: P. villiersi

Binomial name
- Pterolabis villiersi (Brindle, 1968)

Genus of earwigs

Pterolabis is a monotypic genus of earwigs in the subfamily Isolabidinae containing a single species Pterolabis villiersi from the Congo Basin.
