= Platylabia =

Scientific classification
- Domain: Eukaryota
- Kingdom: Animalia
- Phylum: Arthropoda
- Class: Insecta
- Order: Dermaptera
- Family: Anisolabididae
- Subfamily: Platylabiinae; Burr, 1911
- Genus: Platylabia; Dohrn, 1867

Genus of earwigs

Platylabia is a genus of earwigs, the sole member of the subfamily Platylabiinae. It was cited by Srivastava in Part 2 of Fauna of India. It was also cited at an earlier date by Steinmann in his publication, The Animal Kingdom in 1986, 1989, 1990, and 1993, and by Chen & Ma in Fauna Sinica in 2004.
