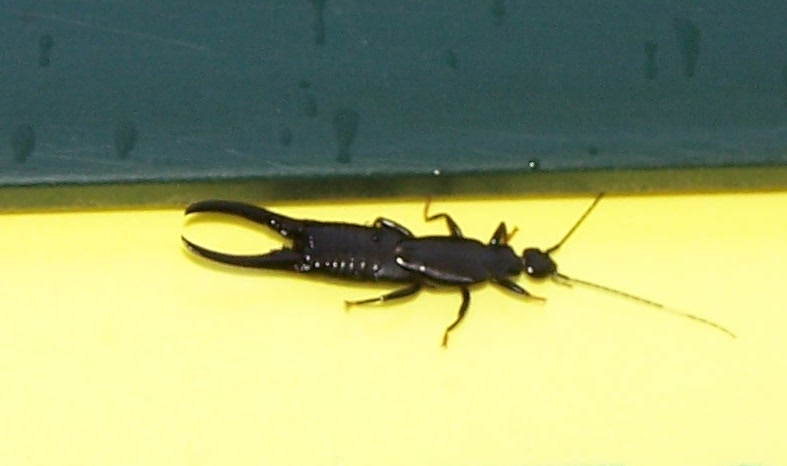
- A black earwig (Chelisoches morio) on a sign in Hawaii Botanical Garden

Scientific classification
- Kingdom: Animalia
- Phylum: Arthropoda
- Clade: Pancrustacea
- Class: Insecta
- Order: Dermaptera
- Family: Chelisochidae
- Genus: Chelisoches
- Species: C. morio

Binomial name
- Chelisoches morio (Fabricius, 1775)

Synonyms
- Forficula morio Fabricius, 1775

= Chelisoches morio =

Species of earwig

Chelisoches morio, the black earwig, is a species of insect in the family Chelisochidae. It is an omnivore that can be found worldwide, however it is most prominent in tropical areas, Pacific islands, the Pacific Northwest, and damp environments. The adults are jet black and can range in size from 18 to 25mm the female. The forceps are used for prey capture, defense, fighting and courtship.

Chelisoches morio are most active at night, though normal behavior also occurs during the day. In addition to consuming prey such as aphids, leaf beetles, hoppers, mites, mealybugs and termites, C. morio also consume fruits such as bananas and dragon fruits.

== Life history ==
Chelisoches morio have four instar stages before molting into adults. Females average about 140 eggs within one batch. The incubation period lasts about 5–7 days. Adult males live for about 60 days and adult females live for about 94 days. Once the eggs hatch into the first instar, the nymphs congregate by the mother. The female then takes one day to feed the newly hatched nymphs. Afterwards, the nymphs molt into their second instar, growing and becoming independent of the female. The third and fourth instars show an increase in activity and predatory behavior, with the fourth instar being capable of killing adult prey.

=== Brood care ===
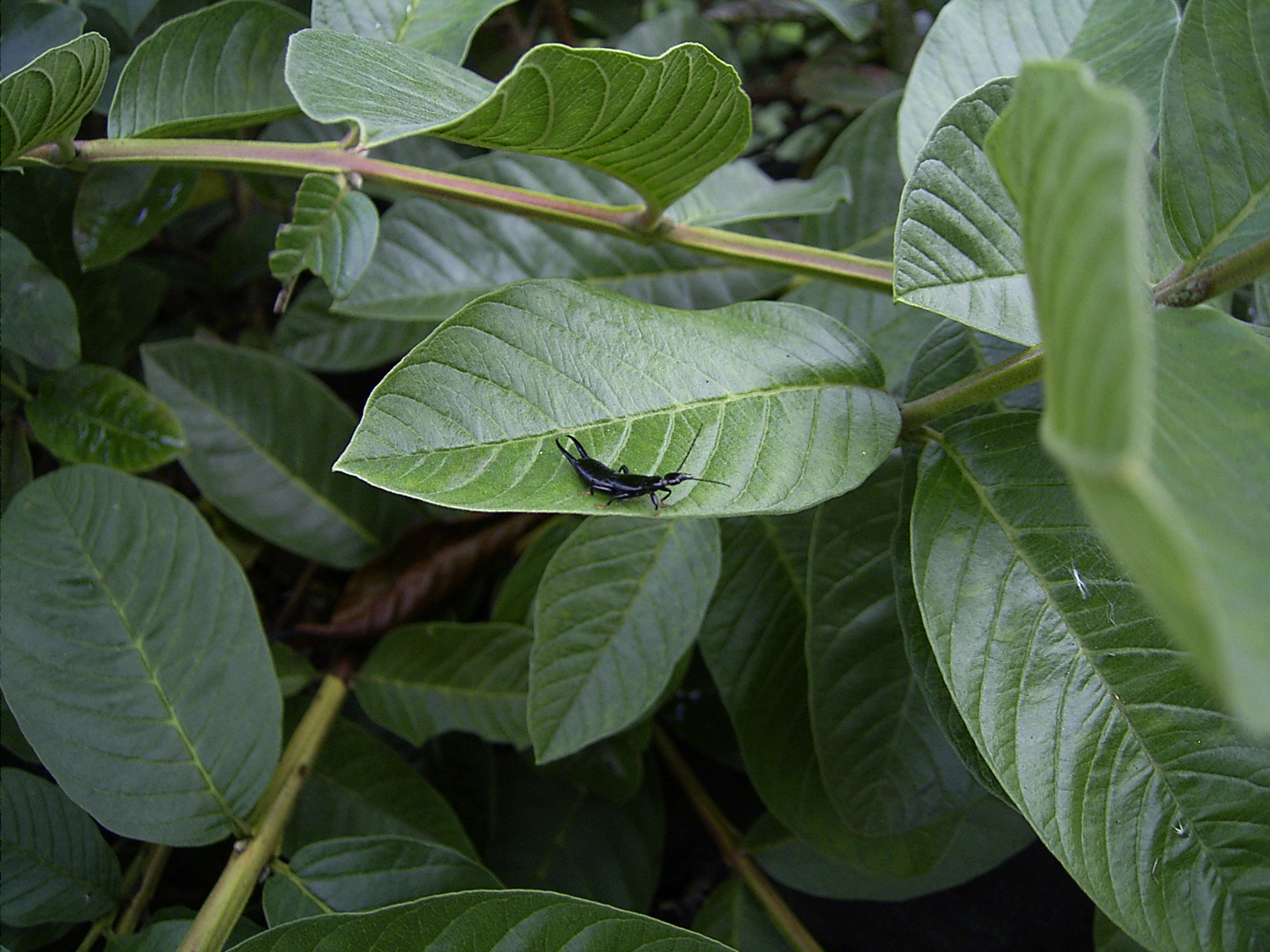
Black earwig in Hawaii

Female C. morio lay eggs in clusters, known as egg masses. The eggs are laid via an ovipositor in an irregularly shaped nest. The nests are about body length in size and are lined with soil and coir particles. The female digs out and builds the nest in moist substrates. After the eggs are laid, the females remains beside the egg cluster and protects, whisks, rearranges and maintains moisture of the eggs with her mouthparts until they hatch. By guarding the cluster, the female ensures the viability of the eggs. If the female is separated from the eggs immediately after laying, they become void and will not hatch.

Once the eggs hatch into the first instar, the nymphs aggregate next to their mother. For the next day, the mother feeds the nymphs and tends to them with her mouthparts. Before molting into their second instar, the nymphs stop feeding. The mother continues to protect them throughout the molting process (10–20 minutes). After the nymphs have finished molting to the second instar, they disperse and maternal care is concluded.

== Reproduction ==
=== Courtship ===
Courtship is initiated by the male. He begins by tapping his antennae back and forth until he reaches the female. A receptive female then begins tapping her antennae back and forth before touching the male's antennae. If the female is not receptive, the male will pursue until the female is receptive, or the female will use her own cerci to repel the male.

The touching of a female's antennae to the male's is the receptive signal that cues the male to move to the side of the female and curve his abdomen. In this position, the male pushes his cerci beneath the subgenital plate of the female, and their genitalia come into contact. A pair of C. morio can mate 2-8 times and copulation can last from minutes to an hour. Additionally, a male can mate with up to 6 females, each of which will produce fertilized eggs.

Mating occurs several times throughout an adults lifetime, and can occur at any time of day. Multiple matings is beneficial to the female as it leads to higher brood counts and increases the proportion of viable eggs.

== Biological control ==
Chelisoches morio is a polyphagous group, meaning it has a wide range of prey. This feature makes C. morio a promising candidate for biological control, as it hunts and kills many agricultural pests. C. morio has shown a huge amount of predation on pests during all larval stages. These pests include Tirathaba rufivena, Pseudococcidae, Aphididae, Chrysomelidae and many others. The high prey consumption rates have made C. morio a focus of many different studies, ranging from the volume of pest intake, to their life cycle, and even testing different rearing techniques to most effectively protect agricultural land.
