= Antisolabis =

Scientific classification
- Domain: Eukaryota
- Kingdom: Animalia
- Phylum: Arthropoda
- Class: Insecta
- Order: Dermaptera
- Family: Anisolabididae
- Subfamily: Antisolabidinae; Brindle, 1978
- Genus: Antisolabis; Burr, 1911

Genus of earwigs

Antisolabis is a genus of earwigs, the sole member of the subfamily Antisolabiinae.

It was cited by Srivastava in Part 2 of Fauna of India. It was also cited at an earlier date by Steinmann in his publication, The Animal Kingdom in 1986, 1989, 1990, and 1993.

== Species ==
The Dermaptera Species File lists:

- Antisolabis allardi (Brindle, 1971)
- Antisolabis arripiens Burr, 1914
- Antisolabis brincki (Brindle, 1971
- Antisolabis camerunensis (Borelli, 1914)
- Antisolabis ceylonica (Brindle, 1977)
- Antisolabis cordata (Brindle, 1976)
- Antisolabis dammermani (Borelli, 1926)
- Antisolabis fijica Steinmann, 1989
- Antisolabis forficula (Burr, 1914)
- Antisolabis formicoides (Burr, 1911)
- Antisolabis fusca (Brindle, 1966)
- Antisolabis geniculata (Montrouzier, 1864)
- Antisolabis gisleni (Hincks, 1954)
- Antisolabis greensladei (Brindle, 1970)
- Antisolabis holdhausi (Burr, 1910)
- Antisolabis javana Boeseman, 1954
- Antisolabis kelangi (Brindle, 1969)
- Antisolabis meridionalis (Brindle, 1978)
- Antisolabis minima (Brindle, 1966)
- Antisolabis myrmecoides Burr, 1911
- Antisolabis neuter Steinmann, 1987
- Antisolabis notabilis Steinmann, 1981
- Antisolabis rugosa (Brindle, 1966)
- Antisolabis seychellensis (Brindle, 1976)
- Antisolabis solitaria Steinmann, 1989
- Antisolabis sulcatipes Burr, 1911
- Antisolabis tongaica Steinmann, 1989
- Antisolabis transiens Burr, 1914
- Antisolabis venusta Steinmann, 1989
