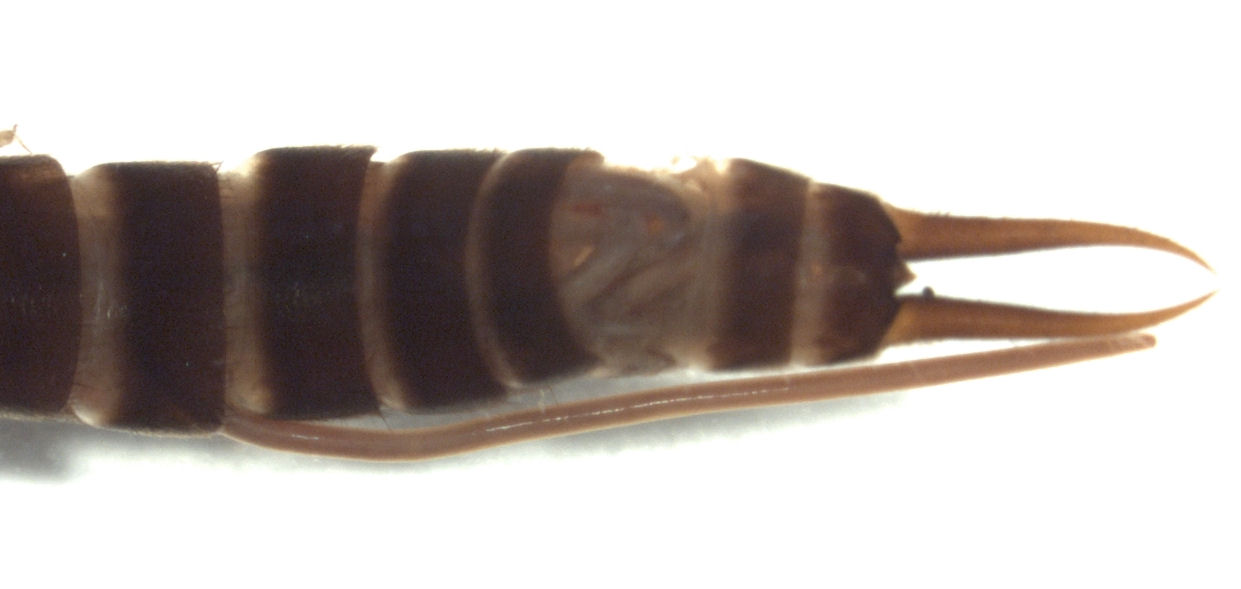

Scientific classification
- Domain: Eukaryota
- Kingdom: Animalia
- Phylum: Arthropoda
- Class: Insecta
- Order: Dermaptera
- Family: Anisolabididae
- Subfamily: Parisolabidinae
- Genus: Parisolabis; Verhoeff, 1904

= Parisolabis =

Genus of earwigs

Parisolabis is a genus of earwigs in the subfamily Parisolabidinae.
