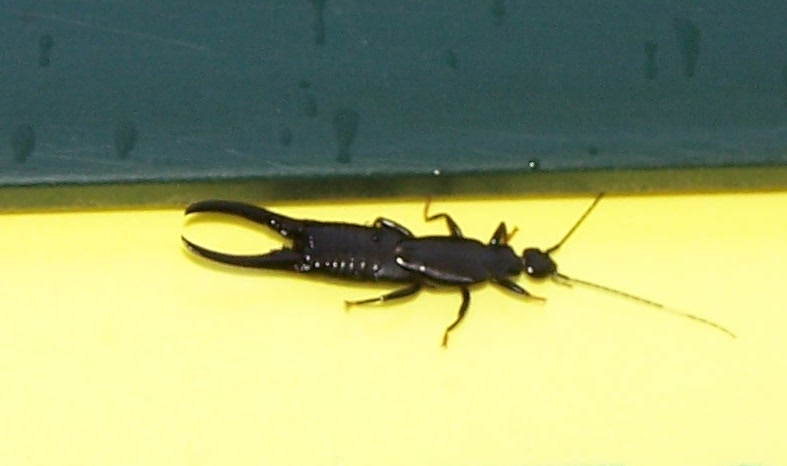
- A black earwig (Chelisoches morio) on a sign in Hawaii Botanical Garden

Scientific classification
- Domain: Eukaryota
- Kingdom: Animalia
- Phylum: Arthropoda
- Class: Insecta
- Order: Dermaptera
- Family: Chelisochidae
- Subfamily: Chelisochinae
- Genus: Chelisoches; Scudder, 1876

Species
- See text

Synonyms
- Enkrates Burr 1907; Kleiduchus Burr 1911; Lobophora Audinet-Serville, 1838 (preoccupied)

= Chelisoches =

Genus of earwigs

Chelisoches (name coming from Greek from χηλη οχεω 'pincer-carrier') is a genus of earwigs in the family Chelisochidae. Species are from the Pacific Islands. C. morio has been introduced to California and Florida.

== Species ==
This genus includes the following species:

- Chelisoches annulatus
- Chelisoches ater (Bormans, 1900)
- Chelisoches australicus (Le Guillou, 1841)
- Chelisoches handschini Günther, 1934
- Chelisoches kimberleyensis Mjöberg, 1913
- Chelisoches morio (Fabricius, 1775)

== Names brought to synonymy ==
- Chelisoches elegans De Bormans, 1900, a synonym for Euenkrates elegans (De Bormans, 1900) [Srivastava 1976].
