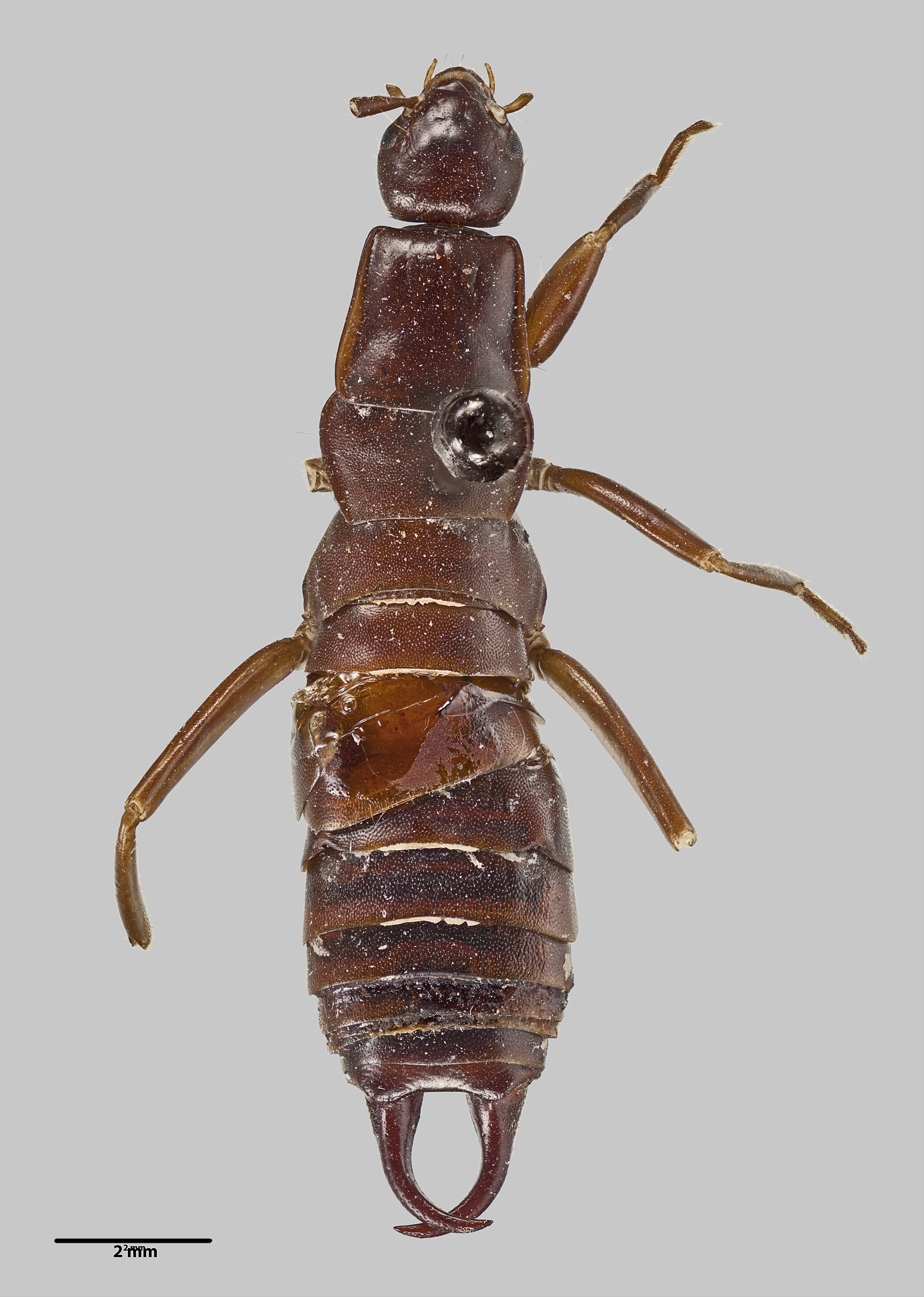
- Brachylabis manawatawhi

Scientific classification
- Domain: Eukaryota
- Kingdom: Animalia
- Phylum: Arthropoda
- Class: Insecta
- Order: Dermaptera
- Family: Anisolabididae
- Subfamily: Brachylabidinae
- Genus: Brachylabis; Dohrn, 1864

= Brachylabis =

Genus of earwigs

Brachylabis is a genus of earwigs in the subfamily Brachylabidinae.
