= Metisolabis =

Scientific classification
- Domain: Eukaryota
- Kingdom: Animalia
- Phylum: Arthropoda
- Class: Insecta
- Order: Dermaptera
- Family: Anisolabididae
- Subfamily: Brachylabidinae
- Genus: Metisolabis; Burr, 1910

Genus of earwigs

Metisolabis is a genus of earwigs in the subfamily Brachylabidinae.
