= Neolabis =

Scientific classification
- Domain: Eukaryota
- Kingdom: Animalia
- Phylum: Arthropoda
- Class: Insecta
- Order: Dermaptera
- Family: Anisolabididae
- Subfamily: Anisolabidinae
- Genus: Neolabis; Brindle, 1981

Genus of earwigs

Neolabis is a genus of earwigs in the subfamily Anisolabidinae. It was cited by Steinmann in The Animal Kingdom.
