= Paraflexiolabis =

Scientific classification
- Domain: Eukaryota
- Kingdom: Animalia
- Phylum: Arthropoda
- Class: Insecta
- Order: Dermaptera
- Family: Anisolabididae
- Subfamily: Anisolabidinae
- Genus: Paraflexiolabis; Steinmann, 1989

Genus of earwigs

Paraflexiolabis is a genus of earwigs in the subfamily Anisolabidinae. It was cited by Steinmann in The Animal Kingdom.
