= Anophthalmolabis =

Scientific classification
- Domain: Eukaryota
- Kingdom: Animalia
- Phylum: Arthropoda
- Class: Insecta
- Order: Dermaptera
- Family: Anisolabididae
- Subfamily: Anophthalmolabidinae; Steinmann, 1975
- Genus: Anophthalmolabis; Brindle, 1968

Genus of earwigs

Anophthalmolabis is a genus of earwigs, the sole member of the subfamily Anophthalmolabidinae
