= Parisopsalis =

Scientific classification
- Domain: Eukaryota
- Kingdom: Animalia
- Phylum: Arthropoda
- Class: Insecta
- Order: Dermaptera
- Family: Anisolabididae
- Subfamily: Parisolabidinae
- Genus: Parisopsalis; Burr, 1914
- Species: P. spryi

Binomial name
- Parisopsalis spryi Burr, 1914

Genus of earwigs

Parisopsalis is a monotypic genus of earwigs in the subfamily Parisolabidinae. The only species is Parisopsalis spryi.
