= Aborolabis =

Scientific classification
- Domain: Eukaryota
- Kingdom: Animalia
- Phylum: Arthropoda
- Class: Insecta
- Order: Dermaptera
- Family: Anisolabididae
- Subfamily: Anisolabidinae
- Genus: Aborolabis

Species
- See text

Genus of earwigs

Aborolabis is a genus of earwigs in the subfamily Anisolabidinae. It was cited by Srivastava in Part 2 of Fauna of India.

== Species ==
The genus includes the following species:

- Aborolabis angulifera
- Aborolabis cerrobarjai
- Aborolabis emarginata
- Aborolabis kalaktangensis
- Aborolabis martensi
- Aborolabis mauritanica
- Aborolabis mordax
- Aborolabis nepalensis
- Aborolabis nigrescens
- Aborolabis pervicina
- Aborolabis rufocapitata
- Aborolabis tanzanica
- Aborolabis vicina
