= Thekalabis =

Scientific classification
- Domain: Eukaryota
- Kingdom: Animalia
- Phylum: Arthropoda
- Class: Insecta
- Order: Dermaptera
- Family: Anisolabididae
- Subfamily: Anisolabidinae
- Genus: Thekalabis; Kapoor, 1967
- Species: T. genitalis

Binomial name
- Thekalabis genitalis Kapoor, 1967

Genus of earwigs

Thekalabis is a monotypic genus of earwigs in the subfamily Anisolabidinae. It was cited by Steinmann in The Animal Kingdom. The only species is Thekalabis genitalis.
