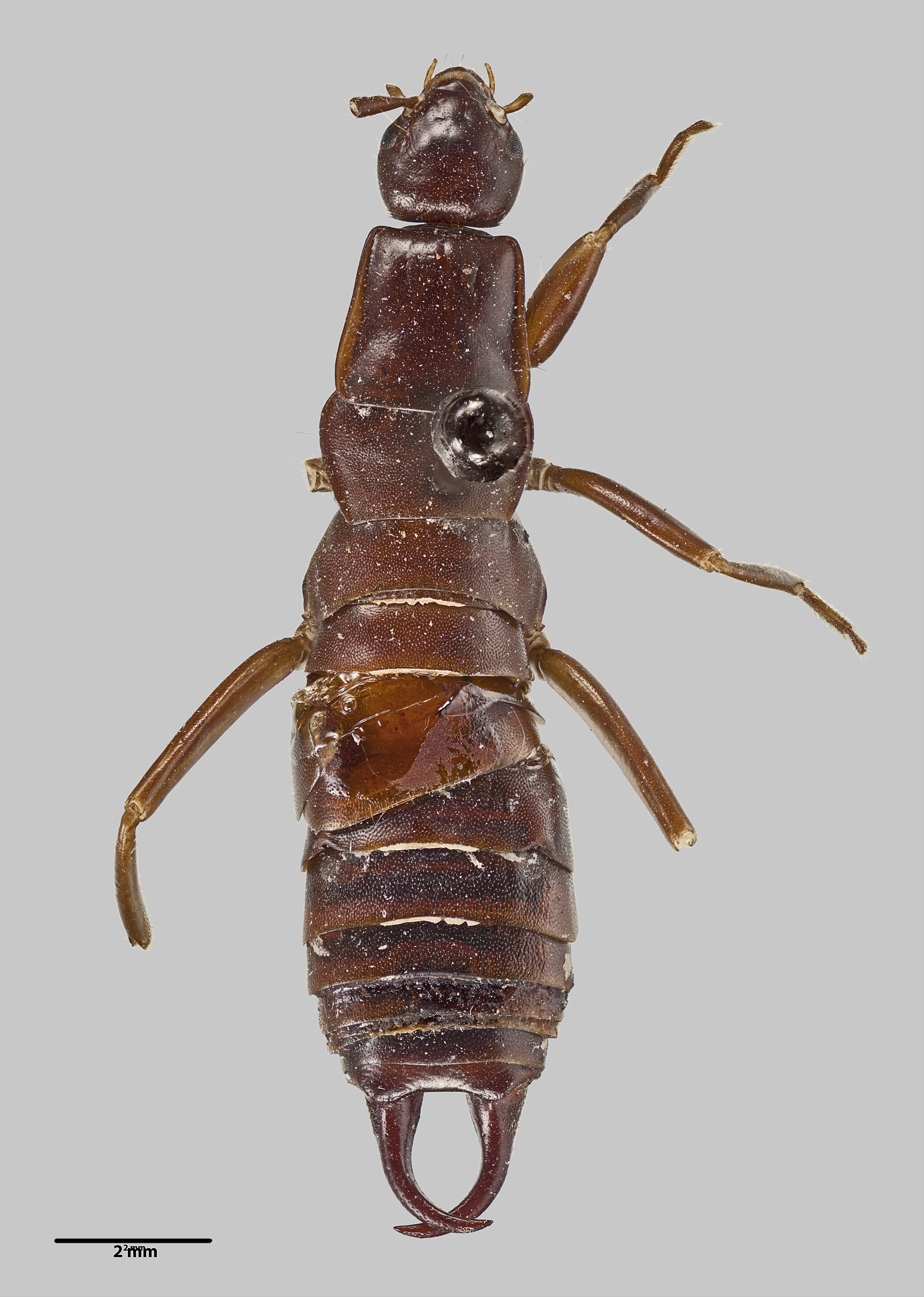
- Brachylabis manawatawhi

Scientific classification
- Domain: Eukaryota
- Kingdom: Animalia
- Phylum: Arthropoda
- Class: Insecta
- Order: Dermaptera
- Family: Anisolabididae
- Subfamily: Brachylabidinae; Burr, 1908

Genera
- see text

= Brachylabidinae =

Subfamily of earwigs

Brachylabidinae is a subfamily of earwigs, containing three genera. The name is often misspelled as "Brachylabinae".

== Genera ==
- Brachylabis Dohrn, 1864
- Ctenisolabis Verhoeff, 1902
- Metisolabis Burr, 1910
