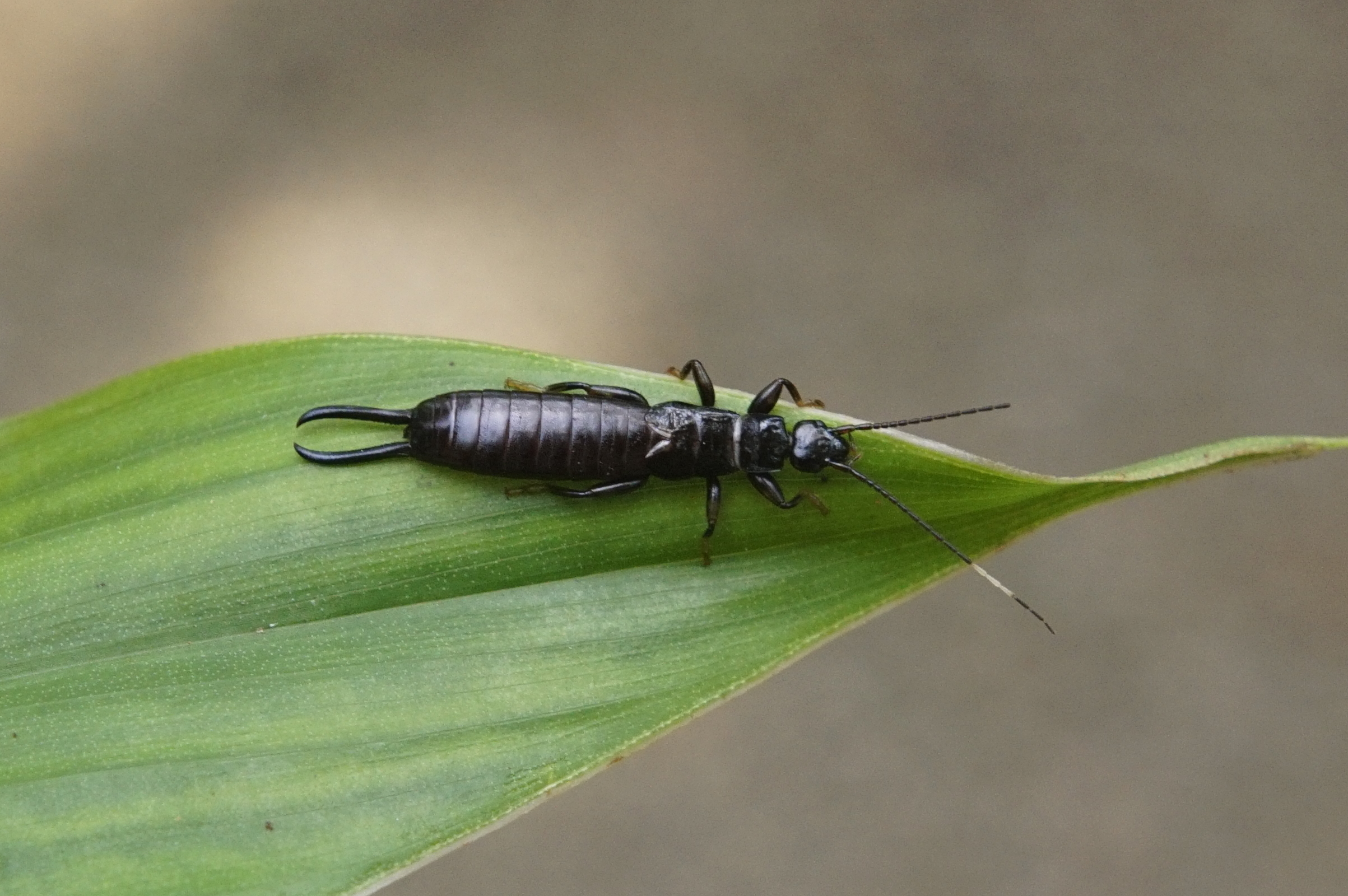
- Chelisoches morio

Scientific classification
- Domain: Eukaryota
- Kingdom: Animalia
- Phylum: Arthropoda
- Class: Insecta
- Order: Dermaptera
- Suborder: Neodermaptera
- Infraorder: Epidermaptera
- Superfamily: Forficuloidea
- Family: Chelisochidae; Verhoeff, 1902

Genera
- See text

= Chelisochidae =

Family of earwigs

Chelisochidae is a family of earwigs whose members are commonly known as black earwigs. The family contains a total of approximately 96 species, spread across sixteen genera in three subfamilies.

They are primarily located in the more tropical Afrotropical, Australasian, and Oriental realms, even though some species, such as Chelisoches morio, are cosmopolitan. They are often dark in color, lending to their common name, and can vary in size. They can be easily identified due to a certain characteristic in their tarsi, involving a ventral projection on the second tarsal segment. Like most earwigs, they are omnivores, and their diet consists of the larvae of leaf-mining insects, as well as certain types of vegetation.

== Genera ==
The family contains the following genera:

- Subfamily Chelisochinae Verhoeff, 1902
  - Adiathella Brindle, 1970
  - Adiathetus Burr, 1907
  - Chelisochella Verhoeff, 1902
  - Chelisoches Scudder, 1876
  - Euenkrates Rehn, 1927
  - Exypnus Burr, 1907
  - Gressitolabis Brindle, 1970
  - Hamaxas Burr, 1907
  - Lamprophorella Mjöberg, 1924
  - Proreus Burr, 1907
  - Schizochelisoches Steinmann, 1987
  - Schizoproreus Steinmann, 1987
  - Solenosoma Burr, 1907
- Subfamily Genitalatinae Steinmann, 1987
  - Genitalata Kapoor, 1974
- Subfamily Kinesinae
  - Kinesis Burr, 1907
