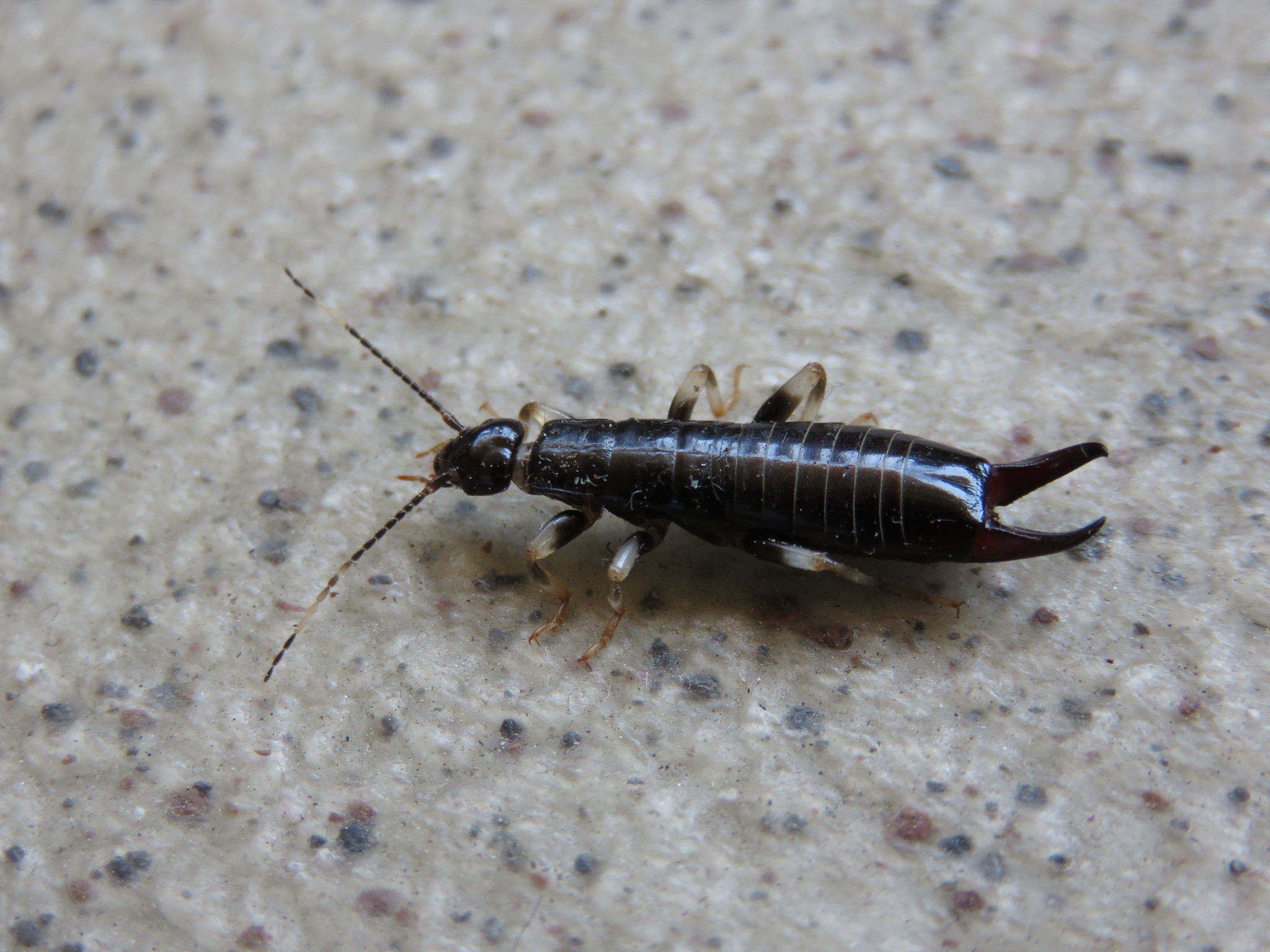
- Gonolabis marginalis

Scientific classification
- Domain: Eukaryota
- Kingdom: Animalia
- Phylum: Arthropoda
- Class: Insecta
- Order: Dermaptera
- Family: Anisolabididae
- Subfamily: Anisolabidinae
- Genus: Gonolabis; Burr, 1900

= Gonolabis =

Genus of earwigs

Gonolabis is a genus of earwigs in the subfamily Anisolabidinae. It was cited by Srivastava in Part 2 of Fauna of India.

== Selected species ==
- Gonolabis dentata Steinmann, 1981
- Gonolabis electa Burr, 1910
- Gonolabis forcipata Burr, 1908
- Gonolabis gilesi Steinmann, 1981
- Gonolabis rossi Brindle, 1987
- Gonolabis tasmanica (Bormans, 1880)
- Gonolabis woodwardi Burr, 1908
