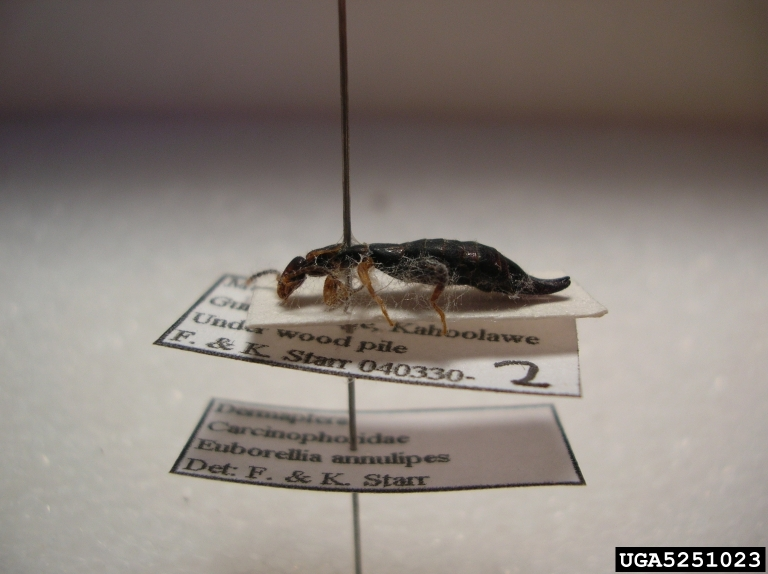
- An adult Euborellia annulipes, or Ringlegged earwig, taken in Gunfire range, Kahoolawe, Hawaii, United States.

Scientific classification
- Domain: Eukaryota
- Kingdom: Animalia
- Phylum: Arthropoda
- Class: Insecta
- Order: Dermaptera
- Suborder: Neodermaptera
- Infraorder: Epidermaptera
- Superfamily: Anisolabidoidea; Verhoeff, 1902
- Family: Anisolabididae; Verhoeff, 1902

Subfamilies
- See text

= Anisolabididae =

Anisolabididae Temporal range: Aptian–Present

Family of earwigs

Anisolabididae is a family of earwigs, in the suborder Neodermaptera and the order Dermaptera.

== Subfamilies ==
- Anisolabidinae
  - Aborolabis
  - Anisolabis
  - Canarilabis
  - Carcinophora
  - Epilandex
  - Euborellia
  - Flexiolabis
  - Gonolabis
  - Indolabis
  - Neolabis
  - Ornatolabis
  - Paraflexiolabis
  - Placolabis
  - Socotralabis
  - Thekalabis
  - Zacheria
- Anophthalmolabidinae
  - Anophthalmolabis
- Antisolabidinae
  - Antisolabis
- Brachylabidinae
  - Brachylabis
  - Ctenisolabis
  - Metisolabis
- Gonolabininae
  - Gonolabina
- Idolopsalidinae
  - Idolopsalis
- Isolabidinae
  - Africolabis
  - Geracodes
  - Isolabis
  - Pterolabis
- Parisolabidinae
  - Parisolabis
  - Parisopsalis
- Platylabiinae
  - Platylabia
- Titanolabidinae
  - Paratitanolabis
  - Titanolabis

Incertae sedis:

The genus †Toxolabis was described in 2014 from a single fossil male recovered from Burmese amber. The single species T. zigrasi matches that of Anisolabididae members. Due to the quality of the preservation, the describing authors were not able to be determine a more specific placement within the family. Kotejalabis **Cretolabia and Cratoborellia are known from the Aptian aged Crato Formation of Brazil.
