= Fur Museum =

Museum on the island Fur in Denmark

Coordinates: 56°49′28″N 9°1′19″E

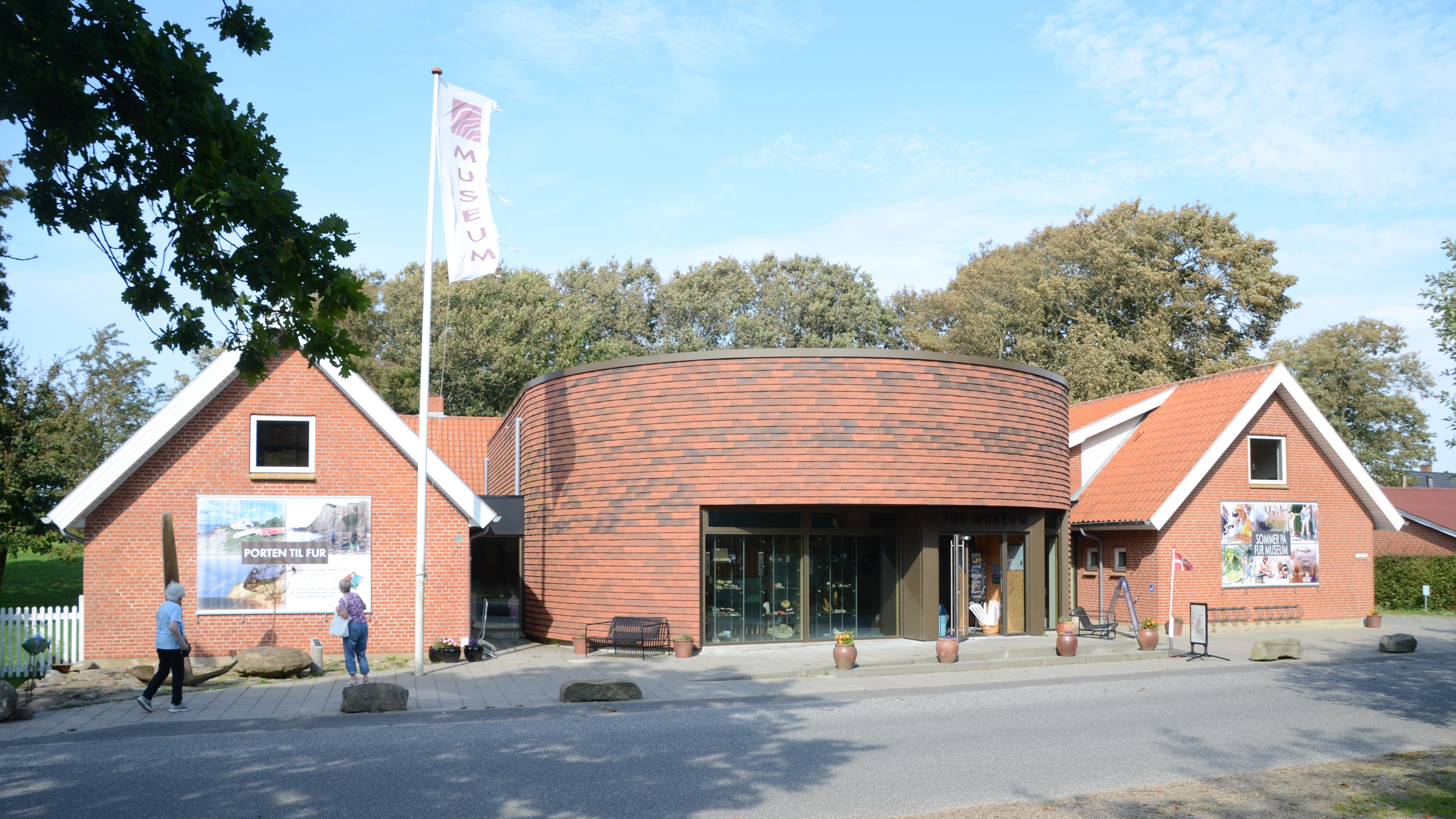
- Established: December 4, 1954; 72 years ago
- Visitors: 34.877 in 2015
- Website: www.furmuseum.dk

The Fur Museum is a nationally recognized local natural history museum in Denmark. The museum is named after the Danish island Fur on which it is located. When the museum was founded in 1954, the focus was on the local history of the island. In 1957, the leader of Fur Museum found the fossil of a big leatherback turtle, and the focus of the museum shifted towards geology and natural history.

Today Fur Museum combines exhibitions on the natural history, geology and environment of the island, with an exploration of its cultural and social history. The Museum is located in the village of Nederby, not far from the ferry port, in the south of the island named Fur, Denmark. The museum is administered as a part of Museum Salling.

== Fossils ==
The museum has a large and diverse collection of early Eocene (55 million years old) fossils collected locally on the island in the "moler" landscape - the Danish name for the Fur Formation - and the underlying Stolle Klint Clay. The collection includes fossils of insects, birds, fishes, reptails, and land plants.

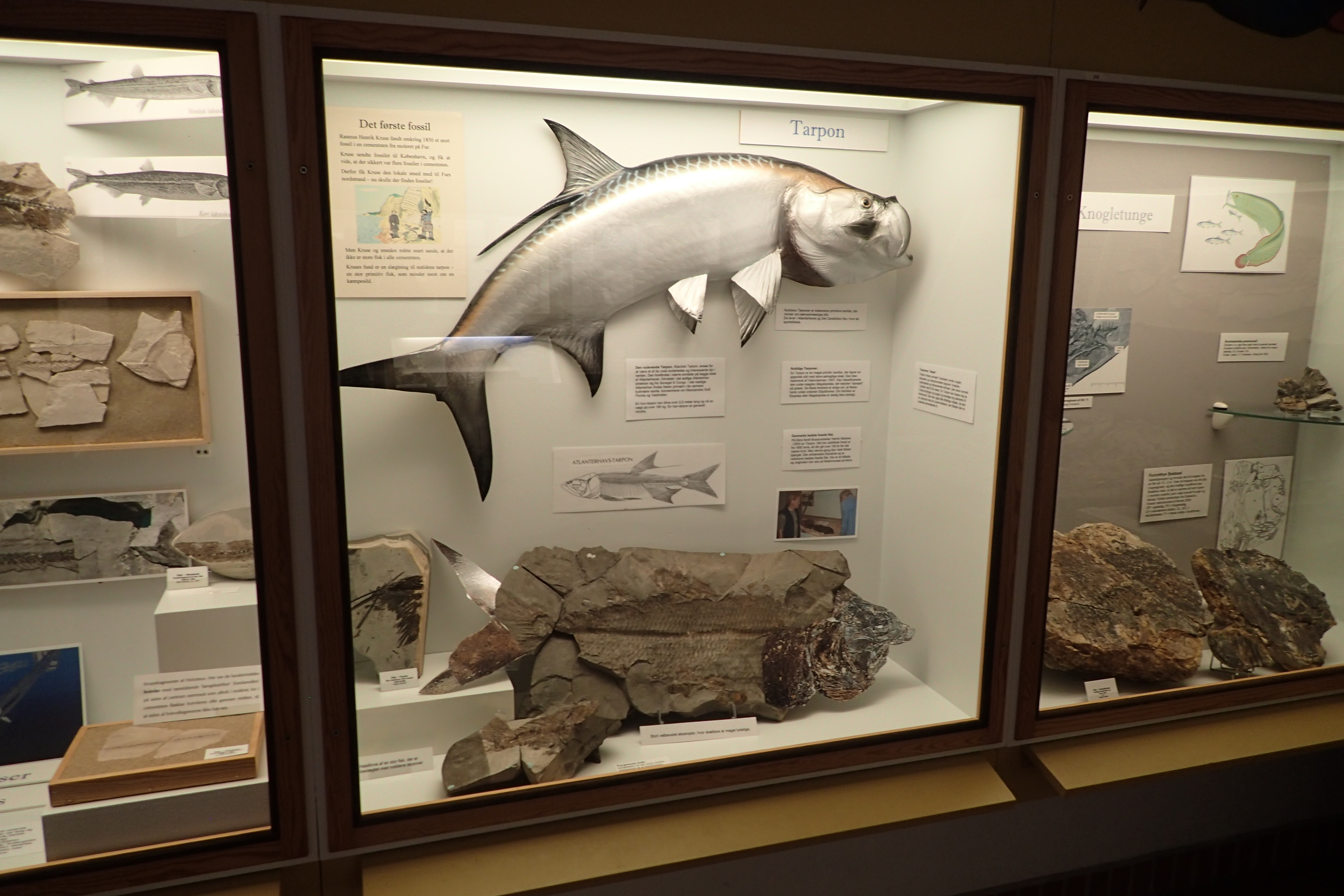
Fish on display, with the center exhibit showing a fossil and a model of a tarpon

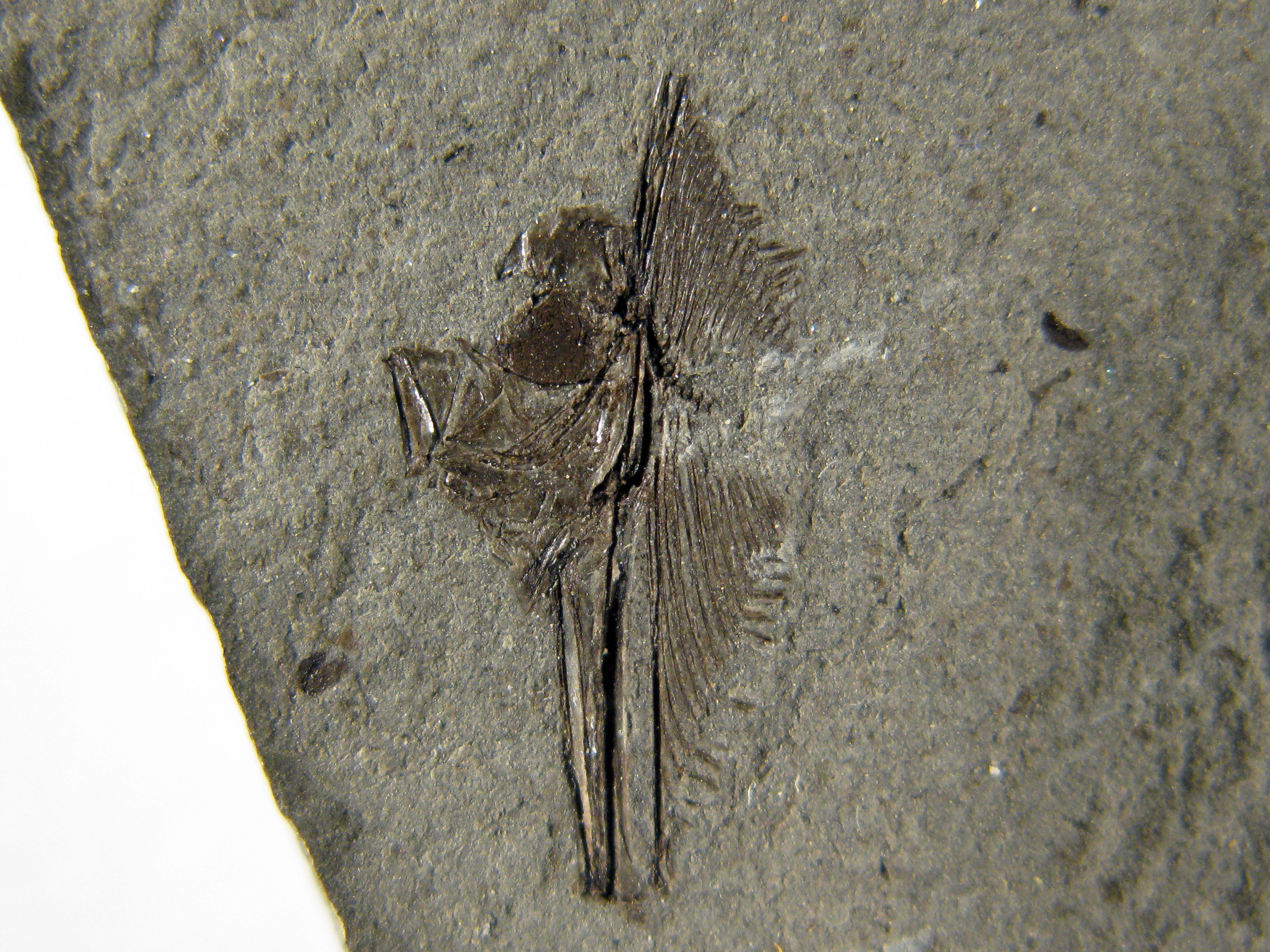
Antigonia boarfish

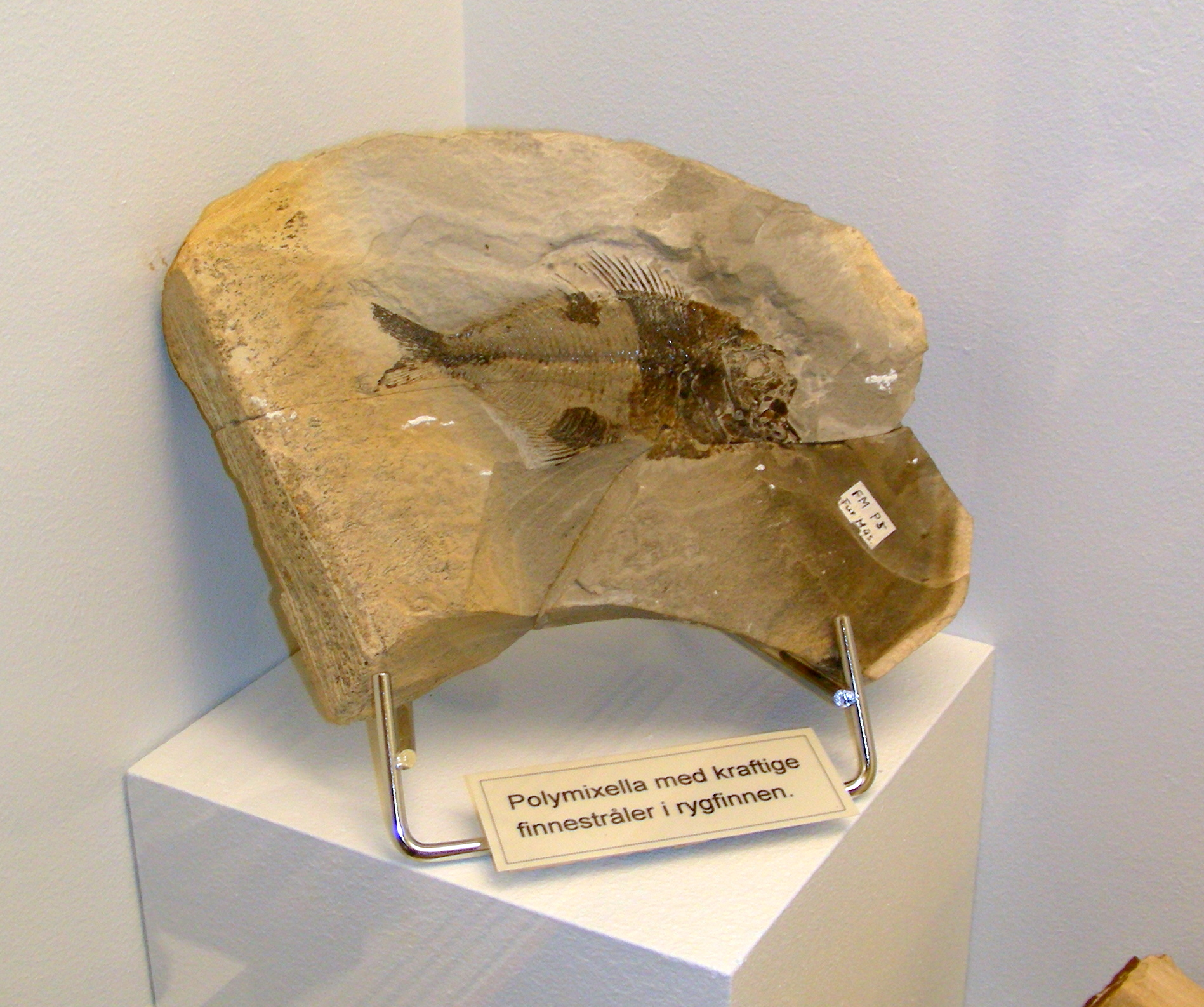
Polymixiid fish

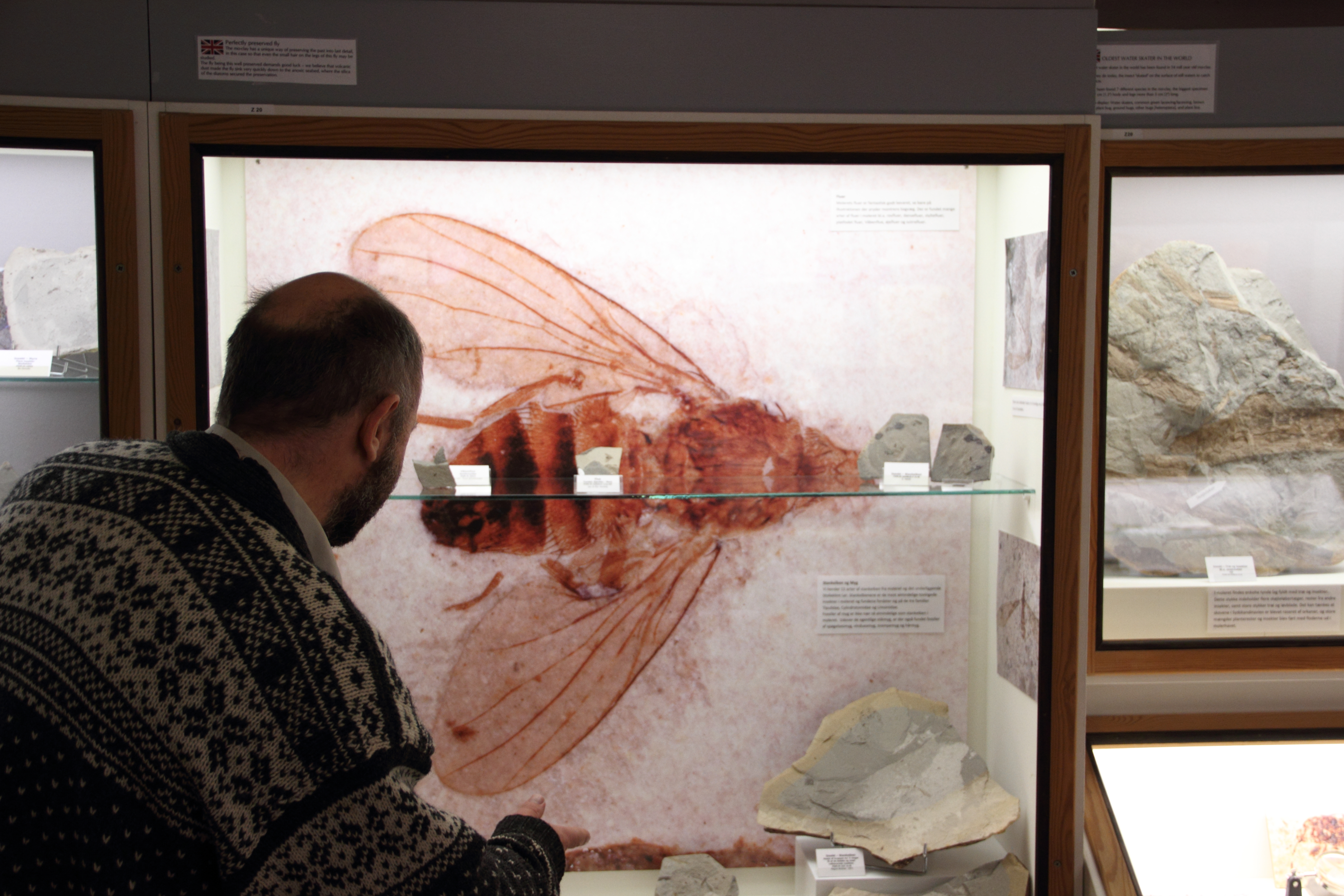
Man looking at fossil fly, with an enlarged photo of the specimen in the background

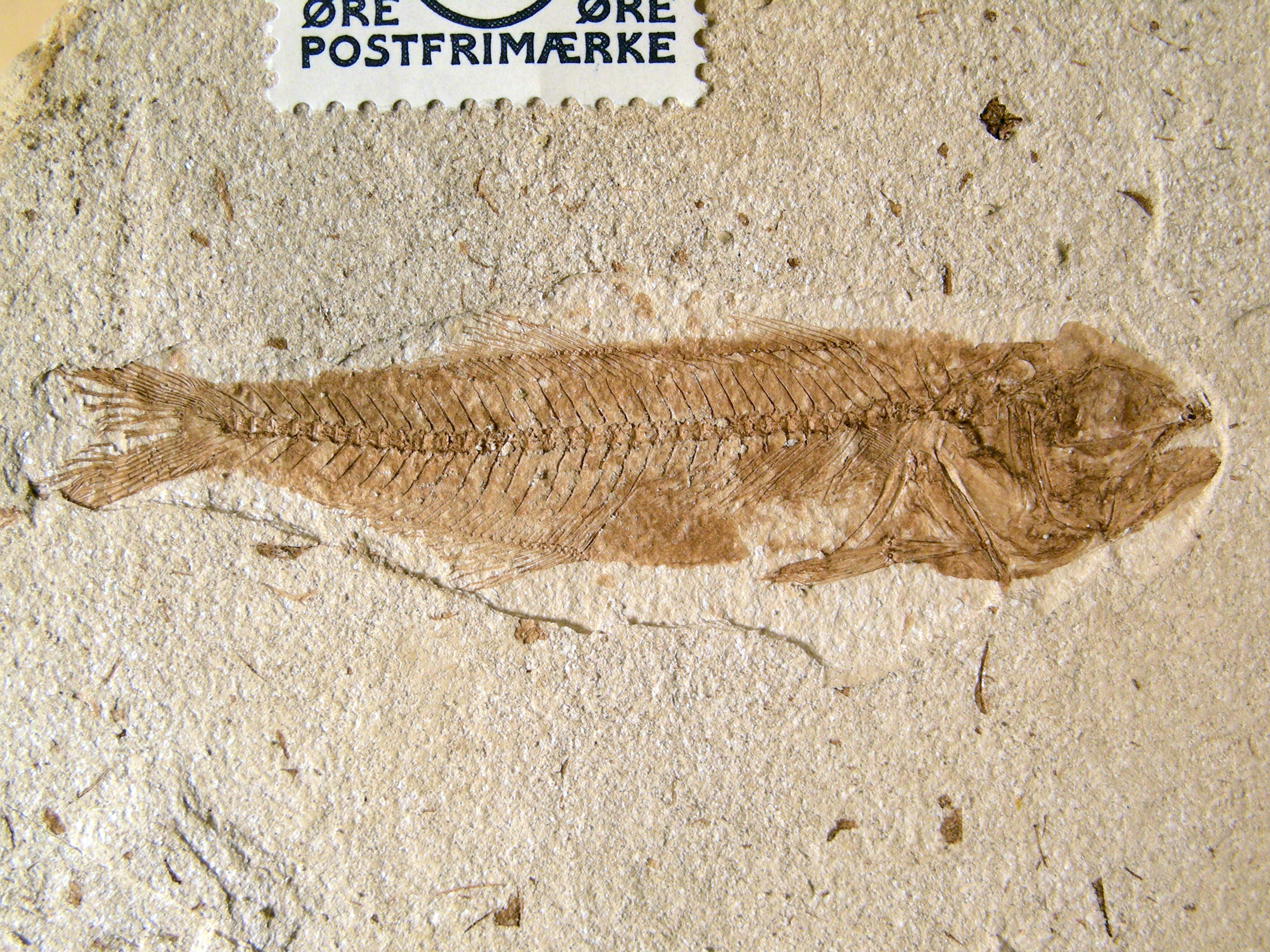
Unidentified fish

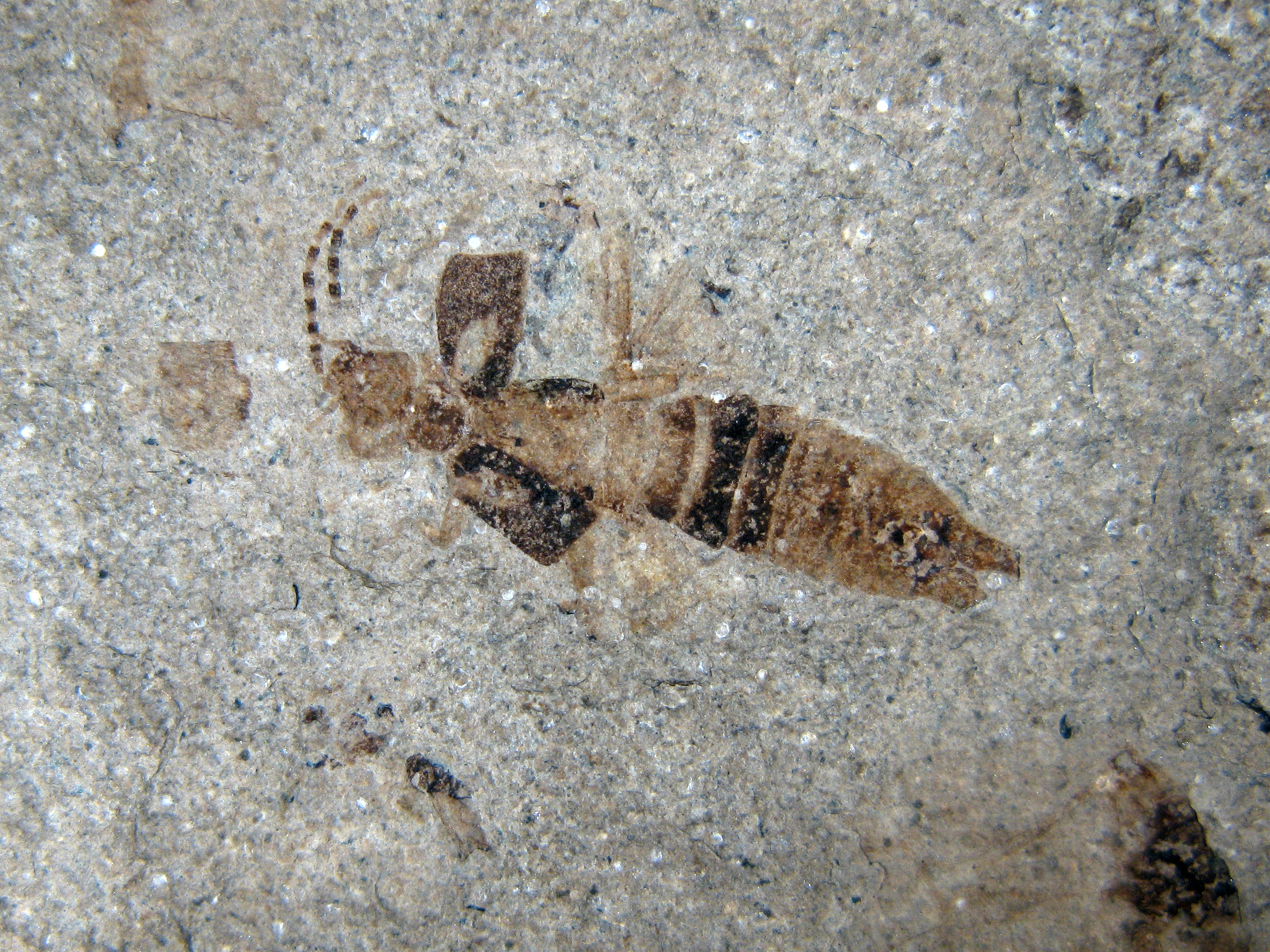
Forficula paleocaenica earwig

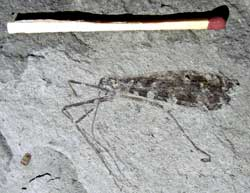
Cimbrophlebia bittaciformis scorpion fly (Mecoptera)

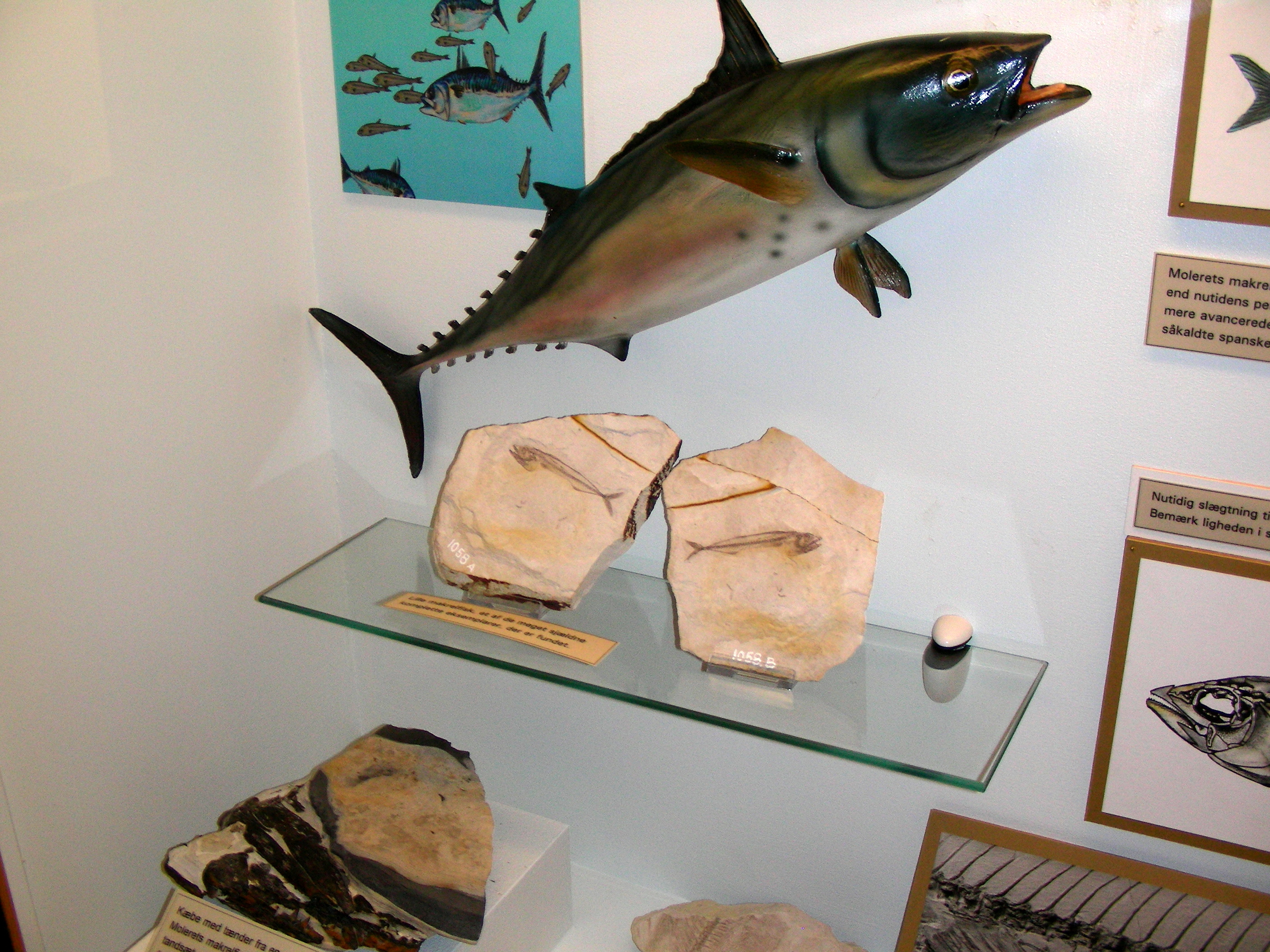
Scombrid fossils and model

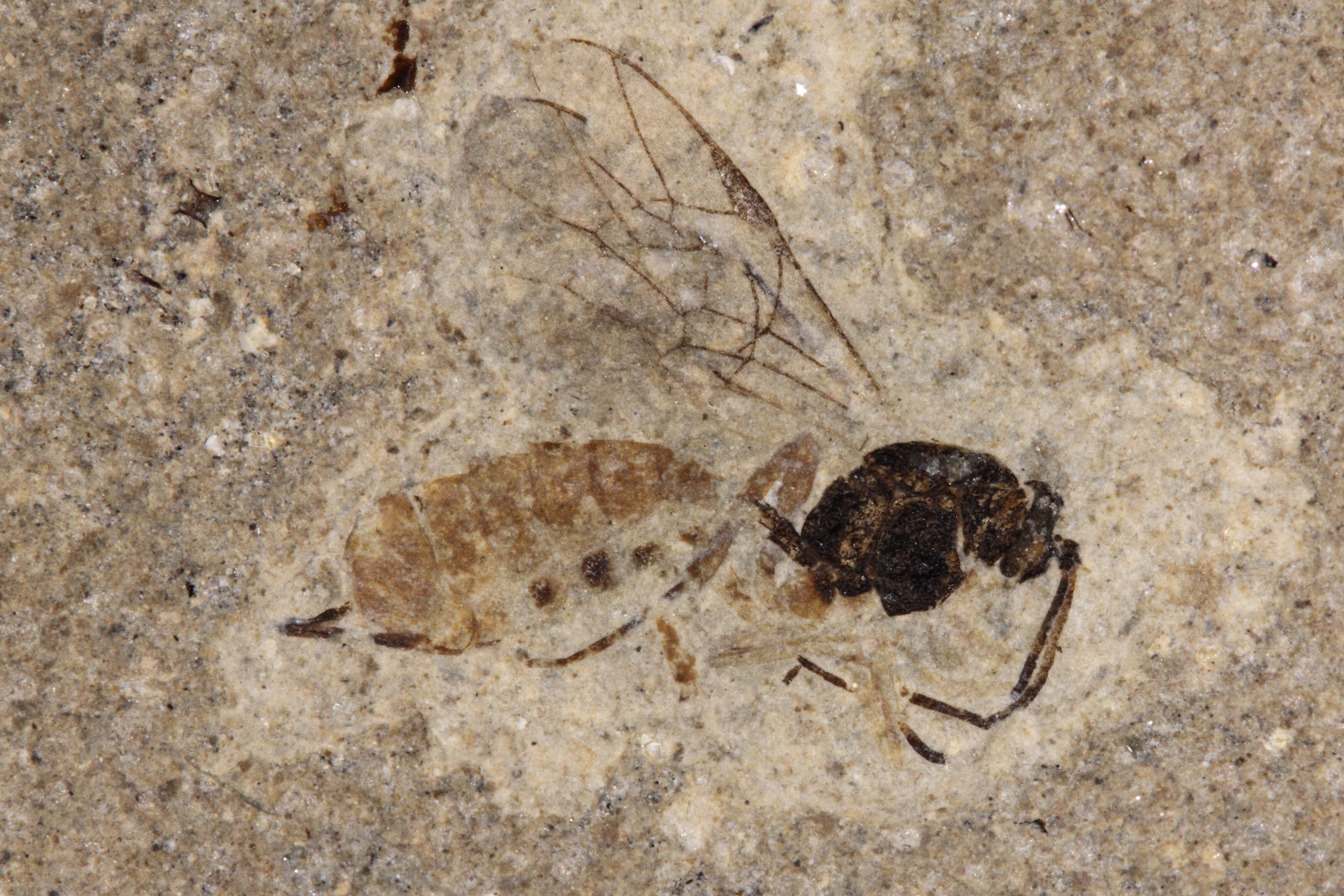
Parasitic wasp

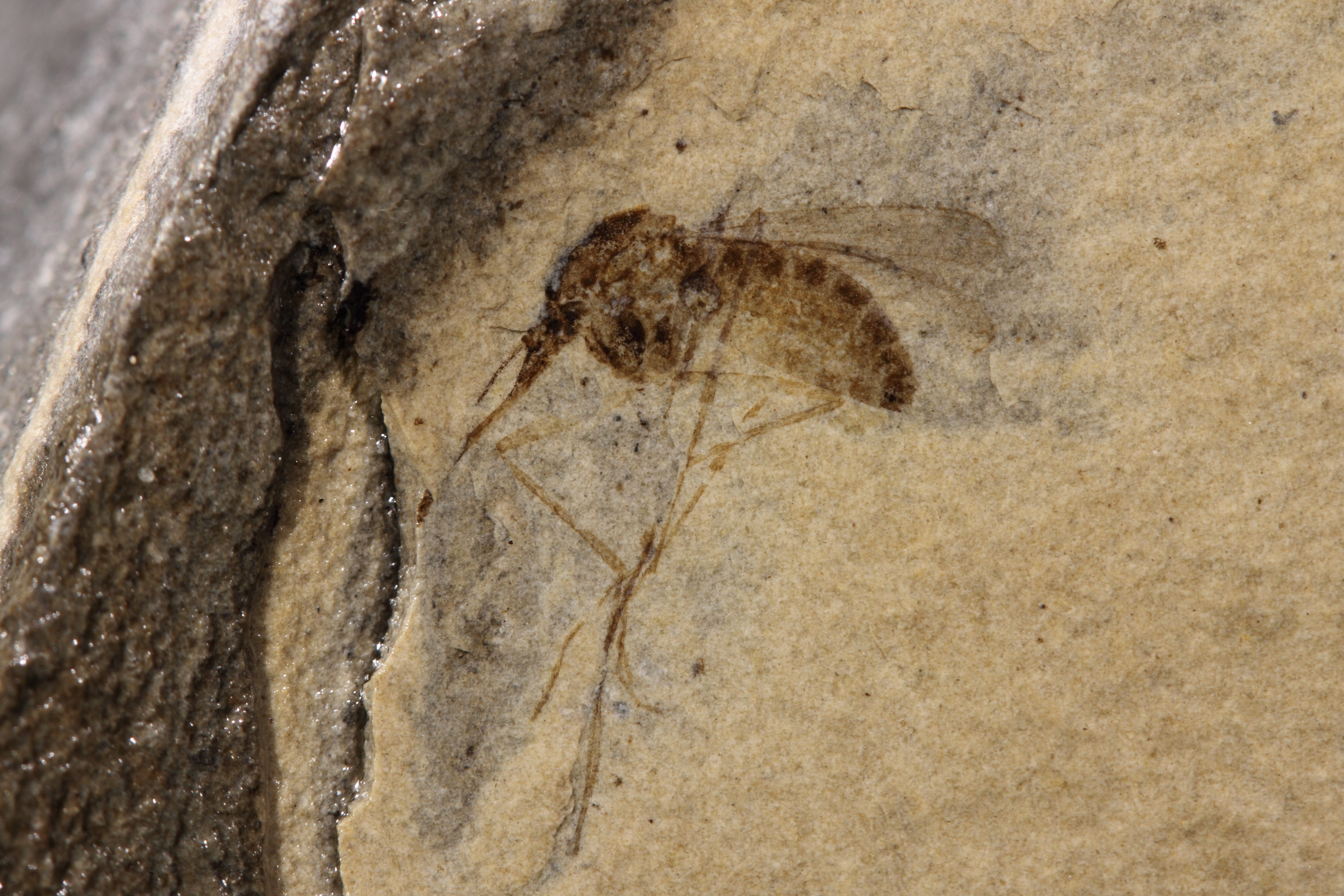
unidentified fly (Diptera)
