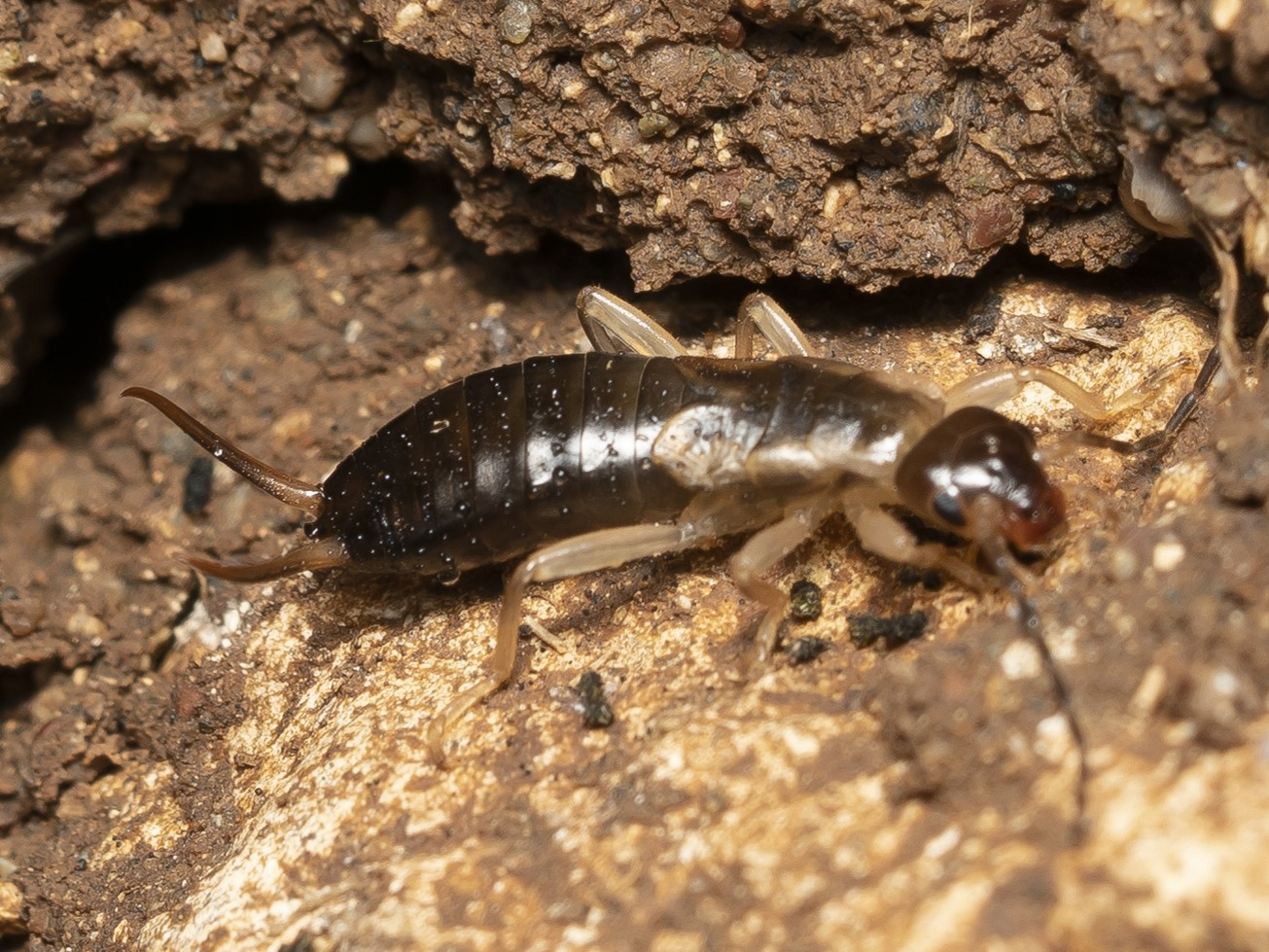

Scientific classification
- Domain: Eukaryota
- Kingdom: Animalia
- Phylum: Arthropoda
- Class: Insecta
- Order: Dermaptera
- Family: Forficulidae
- Genus: Forficula
- Species: F. lurida

Binomial name
- Forficula lurida Fischer, 1853

= Forficula lurida =

Species of earwig

Forficula lurida is a species of earwig in the family Forficulidae. It is found in the Palaearctic realm.
