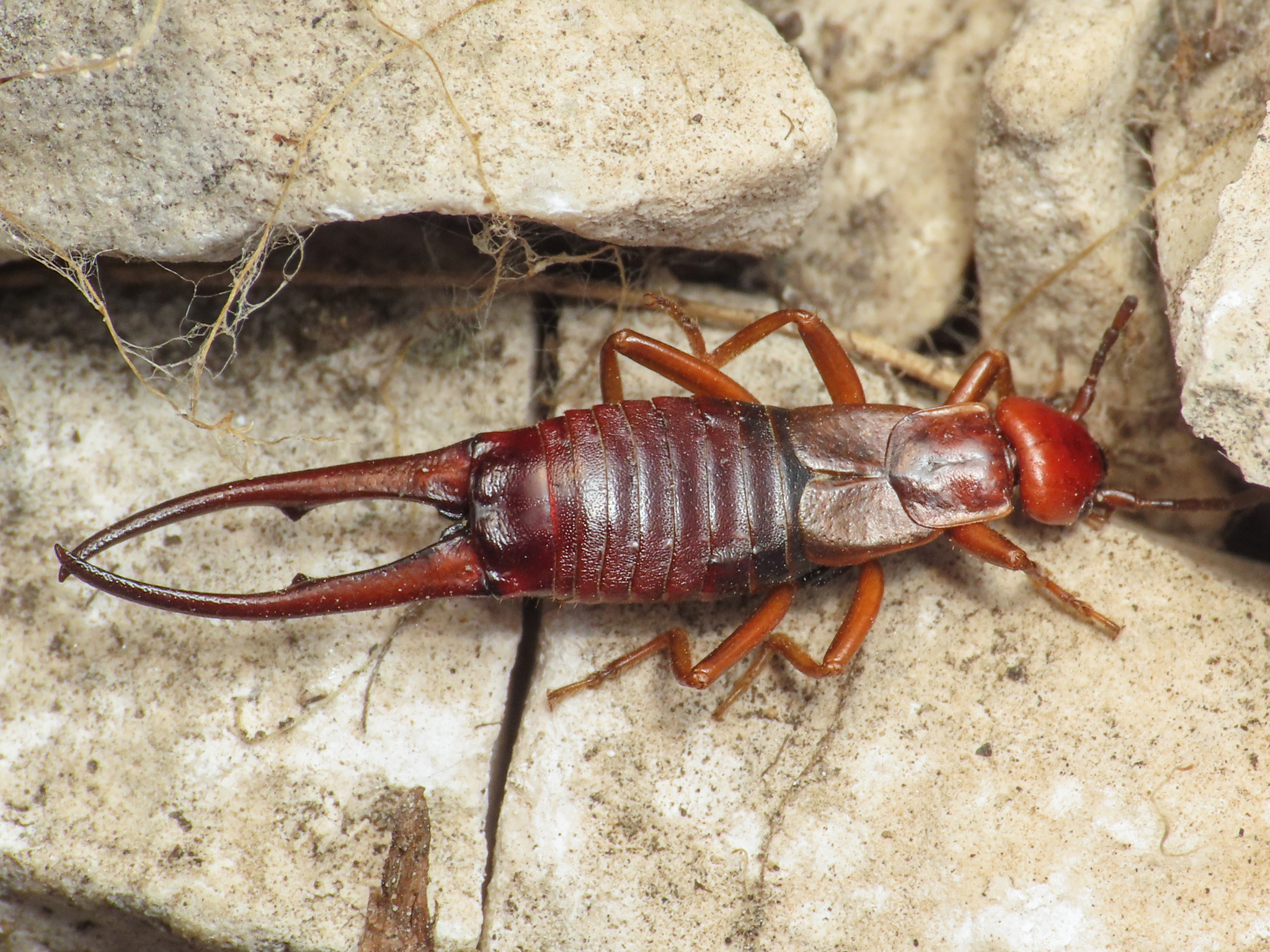

Scientific classification
- Kingdom: Animalia
- Phylum: Arthropoda
- Class: Insecta
- Order: Dermaptera
- Family: Forficulidae
- Genus: Forficula
- Species: F. apennina

Binomial name
- Forficula apennina Costa, 1881

= Forficula apennina =

Species of earwig

Forficula apennina is a species of earwig in the family Forficulidae.
