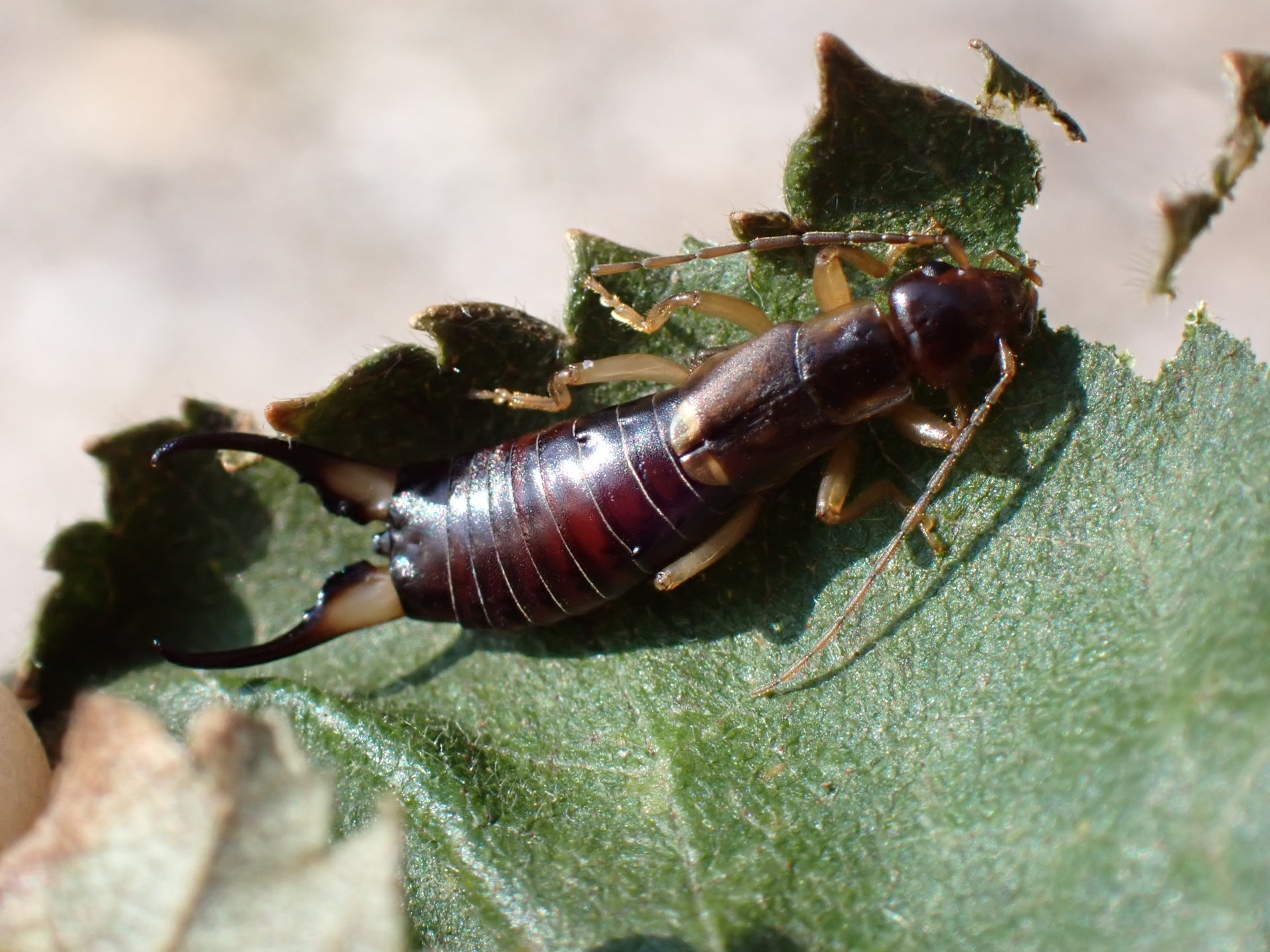

Scientific classification
- Kingdom: Animalia
- Phylum: Arthropoda
- Clade: Pancrustacea
- Class: Insecta
- Order: Dermaptera
- Family: Forficulidae
- Genus: Forficula
- Species: F. vicaria

Binomial name
- Forficula vicaria Semenov, 1902

= Forficula vicaria =

Species of earwig

Forficula vicaria is a species of earwigs in the family Forficulidae.
