= Forficula mikado =

Scientific classification
- Domain: Eukaryota
- Kingdom: Animalia
- Phylum: Arthropoda
- Class: Insecta
- Order: Dermaptera
- Family: Forficulidae
- Genus: Forficula
- Species: F. mikado

Binomial name
- Forficula mikado Burr, 1904

Species of earwig

Forficula mikado is a species of earwig in the family Forficulidae. They are found in the Palearctic realm, particularly in Japan.
