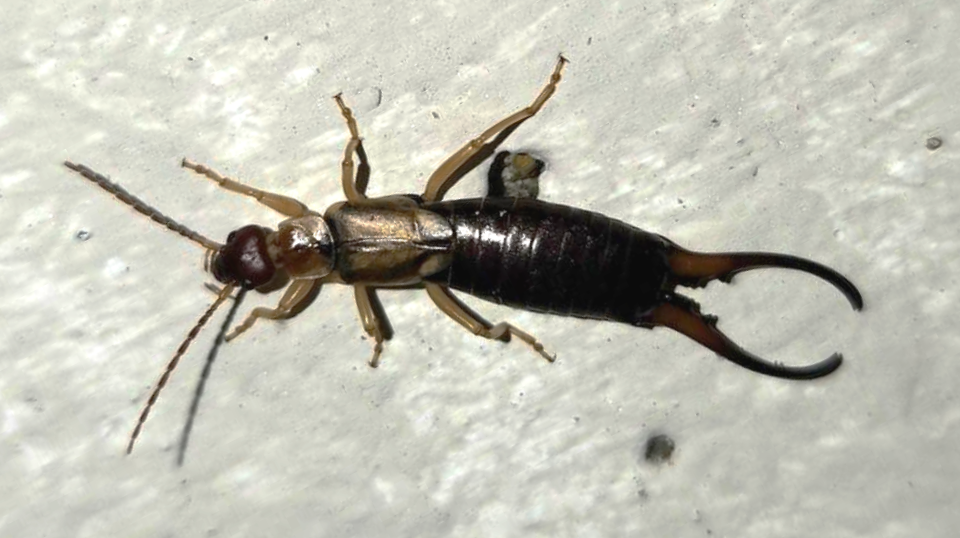
- Male in Redondo Beach, California

Scientific classification
- Kingdom: Animalia
- Phylum: Arthropoda
- Clade: Pancrustacea
- Class: Insecta
- Order: Dermaptera
- Family: Forficulidae
- Genus: Forficula
- Species: F. dentata

Binomial name
- Forficula dentata J.Fabr., 1775

Synonyms
- Forficula borealis Leach, 1835; Forficula forcipata Stephens, 1837; Forficula laeviforceps Chopard, 1937; Forficula media Marsham, 1802; Forficula neglecta Marsham, 1802; Forficula parallela Fabricus, 1775

= Forficula dentata =

Species of insect

Forficula dentata is a species of earwig in the family Forficulidae, commonly referred to as the Western earwig or European earwig. It was first described by Danish zoologist, Johan Christian Fabricius, in 1775.

It is a cryptic species belonging to the Forficula auricularia species complex. Originally thought to be a synonym of F. auricularia, it has since been classified its own unique species. Being cryptic, it is often misidentified as F. auricularia or Forficula mediterranea, which differ in their distribution.

The distribution of F. dentata includes the British Isles, parts of Western Europe, Australia, New Zealand, Chile, the Western United States and Canada. Other populations of this species include the Belarusian Central Botanic Gardens, Belarus; Newfoundland, Canada; and an individual near Gimmingen, Germany.
