= Fur (island) =

Small island in the Limfjord, Denmark

- Location in Central Denmark Region

Geography
- Location: Limfjord
- Coordinates: 56°49′54″N 9°1′27″E
- Area: 21.8 km^{2} (8.4 sq mi)
- Length: 8.2 km (5.1 mi)
- Width: 5.3 km (3.29 mi)

Administration
- Denmark
- Municipality: Skive Municipality
- Region: Central Denmark Region

Demographics
- Population: 732 (2025)

Additional information
- Postcode: 7884

Fur (alternative older spelling: Fuur) is a Danish island in the Limfjord. It is located just north of Salling peninsula in Skive municipality. As of 2025, the island covers an area of 21.8 km^{2} (8½ sq. mi.) and has a total population of 732. The village of Nederby is the largest town on the island. The island is linked to the mainland through a 24-hour ferry, the Sleipner-Fur ferry, sailing from Branden. The crossing of the Fur Strait takes 3–4 minutes.

In 2010, readers of the Danish newspaper Kristeligt Dagblad voted for Fur as "Denmark's most wonderful island", ahead of Læsø and Ærø.

== Geography ==
The island constitutes a unique geological formation within the region, called the Fur Formation. It is renowned for its deposits of moler, which consist of 1/3 clay and 2/3 diatomite. There are two factories on Fur that process moler. Fossil hunting is a popular activity on the island, and the fossils one can find in the moler can be more than 55 million years old. The Fur Museum on the island features exhibits relating to the natural history of the island, particularly fossils which have been found there and moler. It opened in 1953.

Fur was originally rich in Scots pine, but as agriculture gradually required more space, the trees were cut down. In 1627, the last remnant of the original forest died and it was not until the end of the 1800s that forests were again established on the island. Forest area account for 14% of Fur's total area and especially the northern part of the island is forested.

== Wildlife ==
Fur currently has a population of around 200 roe deer, which originate from seven animals that were released on the island in 1965 and 1966. The animals came from Egeskov Castle on Funen. There are also other animals, such as rabbits, hedgehogs, stoats and more.

== Gallery ==
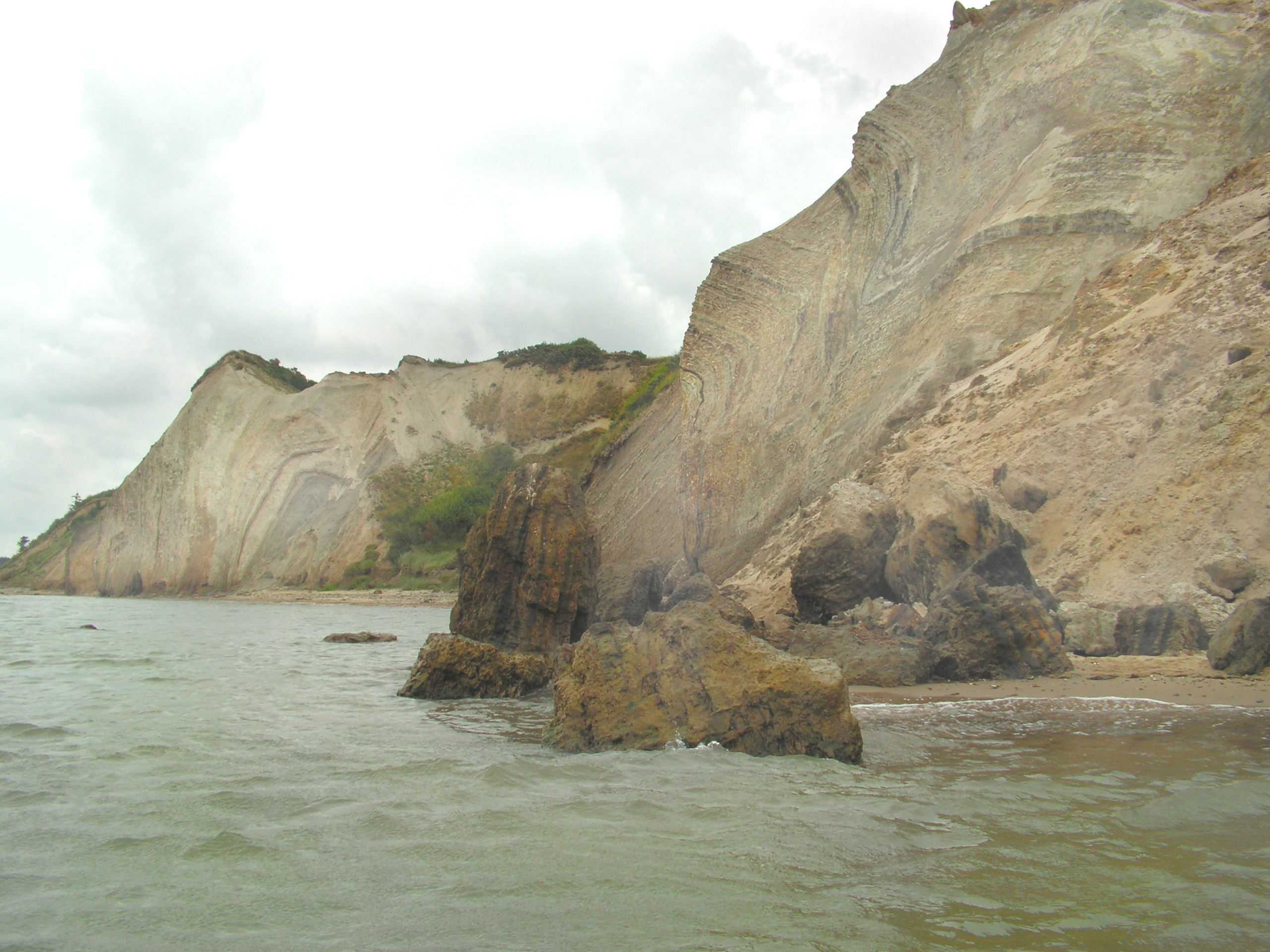
Cliffs on the island's coastline

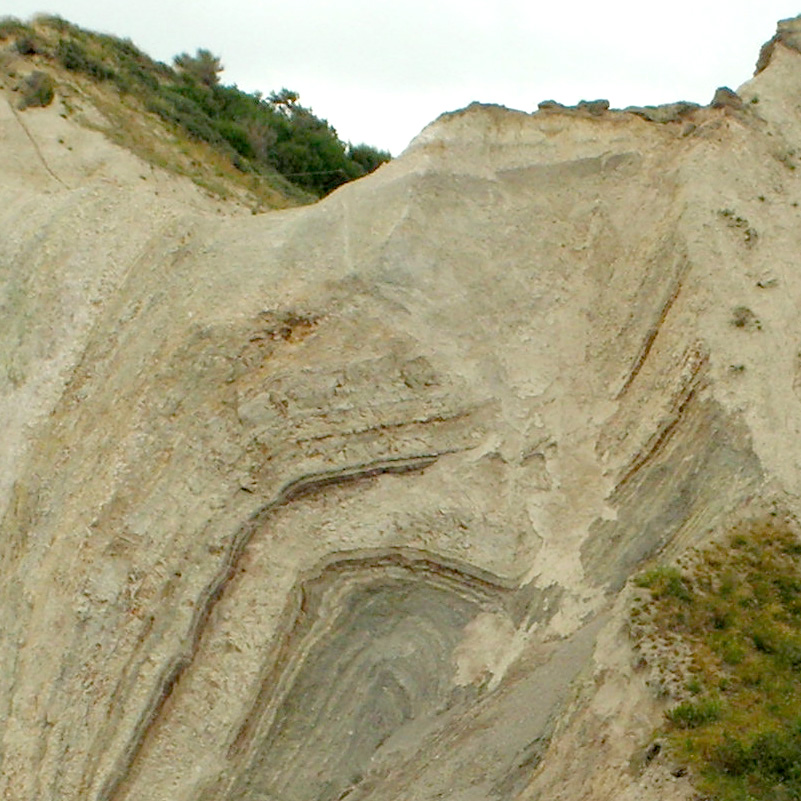
Image showing the distinct geological layers

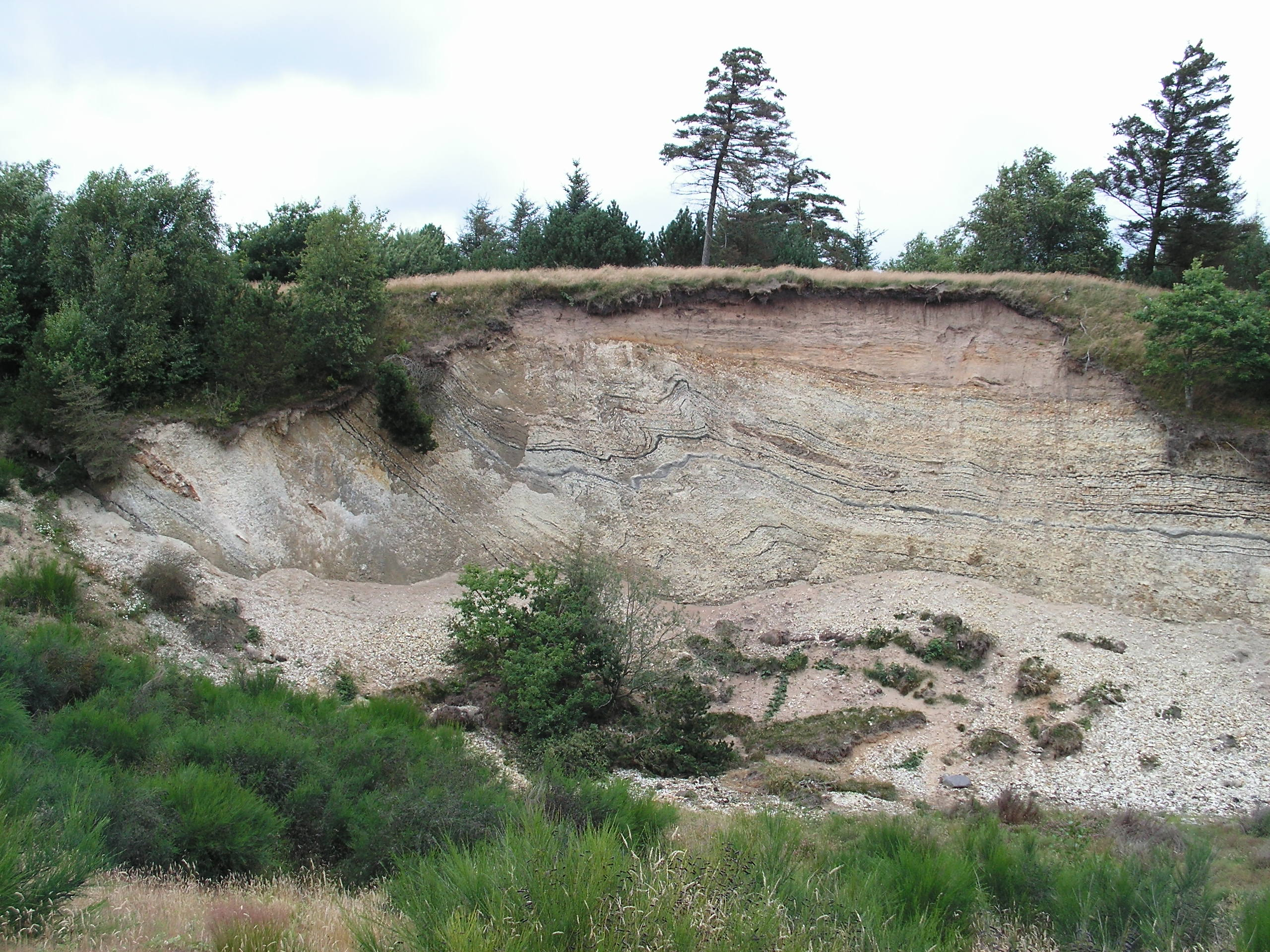
An inland location

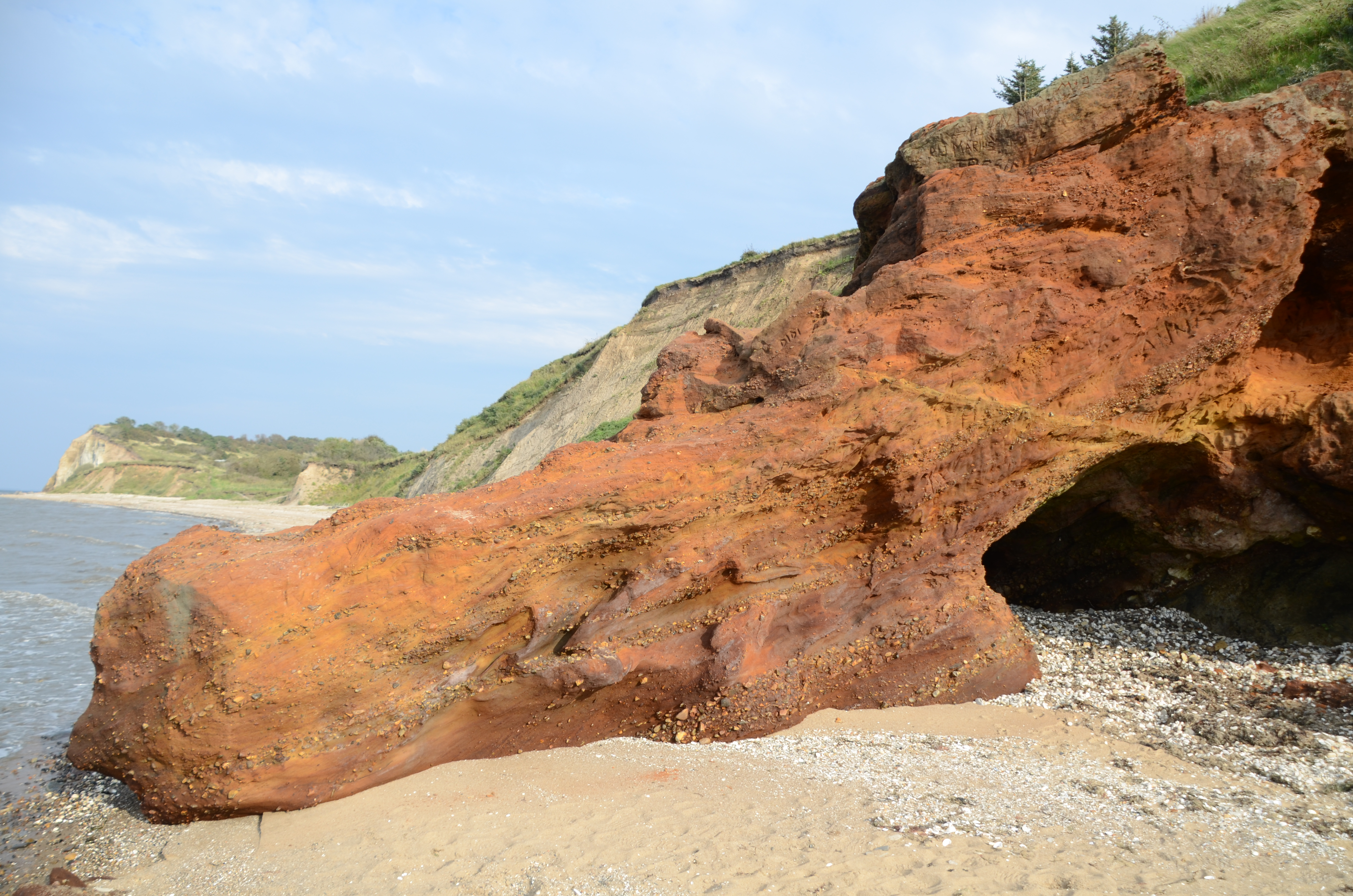
Red sandstone

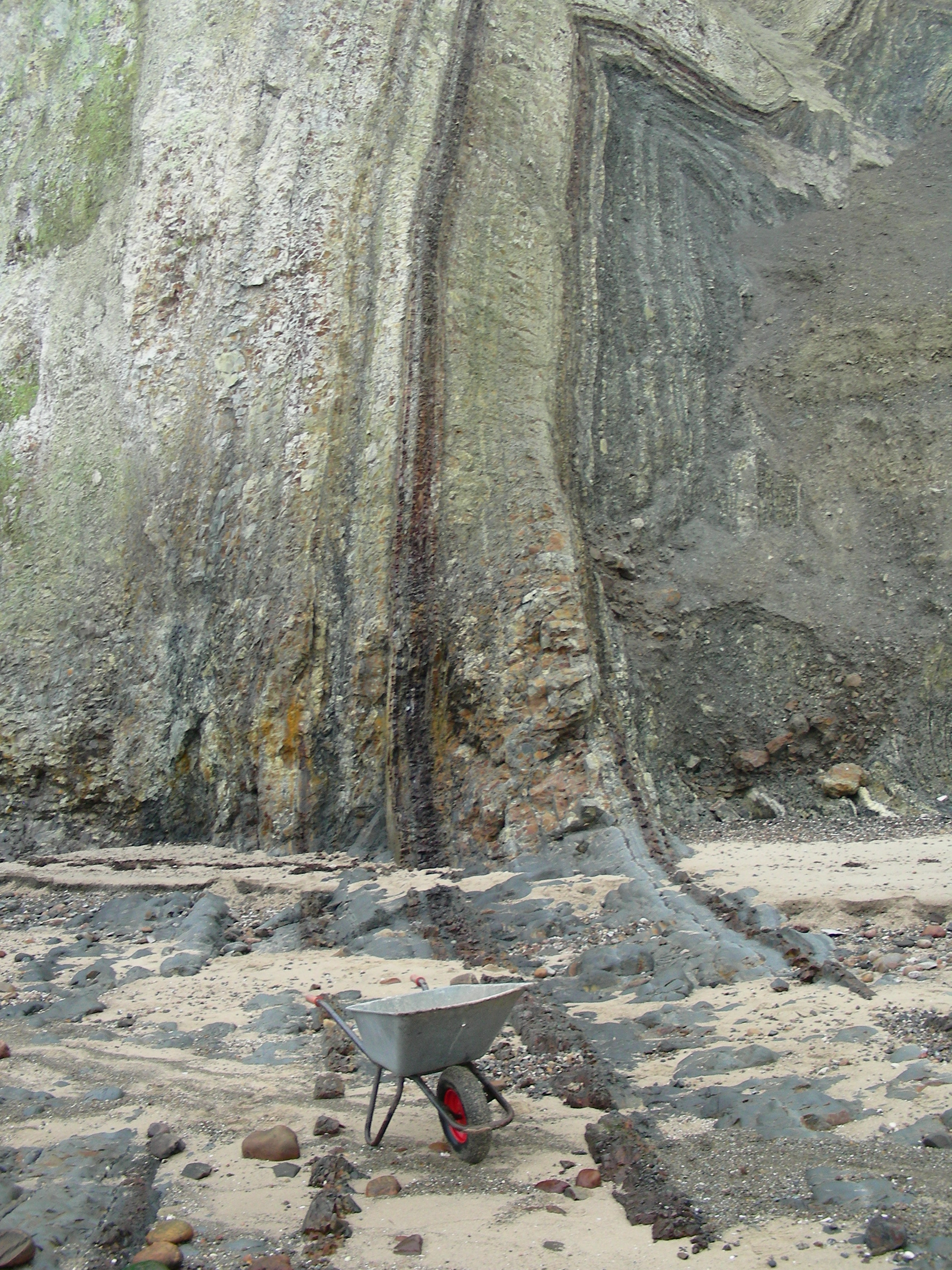
Coastal cliff

== See also ==
- Fur Formation
