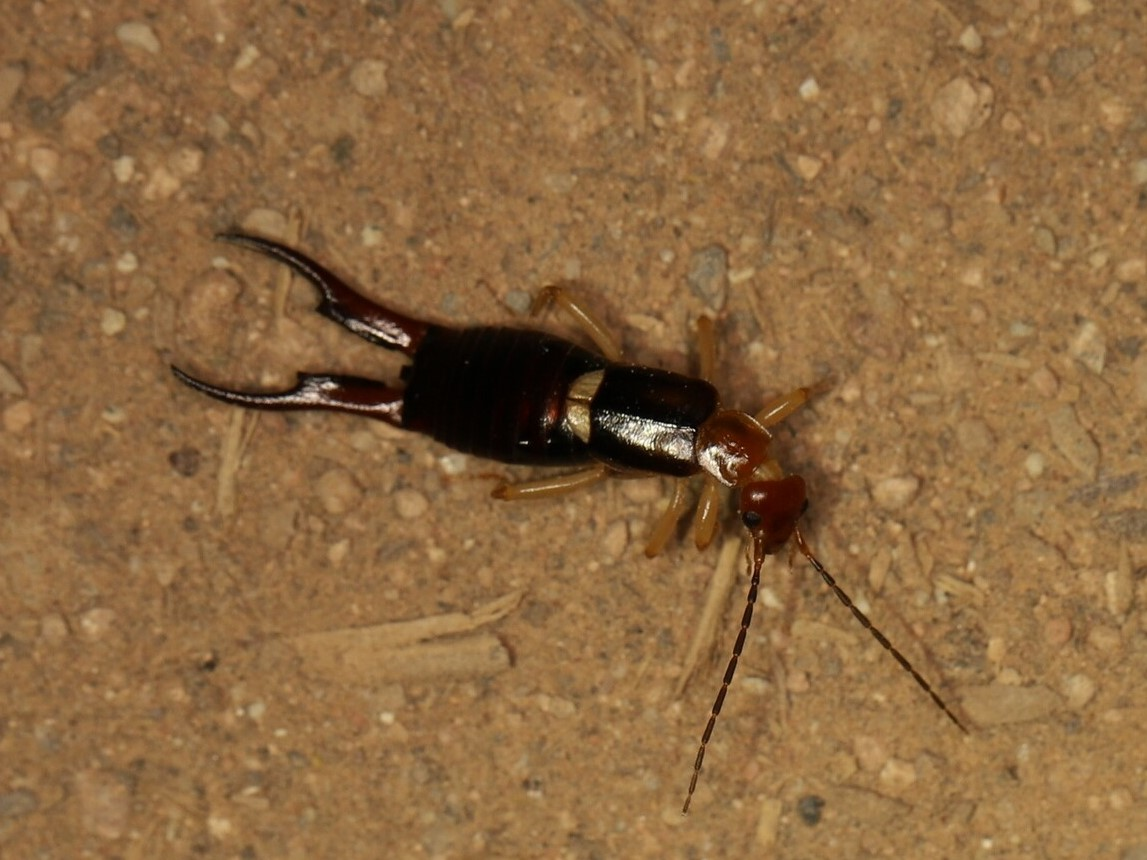
- Male

Scientific classification
- Kingdom: Animalia
- Phylum: Arthropoda
- Class: Insecta
- Order: Dermaptera
- Family: Forficulidae
- Genus: Forficula
- Species: F. riffensis

Binomial name
- Forficula riffensis Burr, 1909

= Forficula riffensis =

Species of earwig

Forficula riffensis is a species of earwig in the family Forficulidae.
