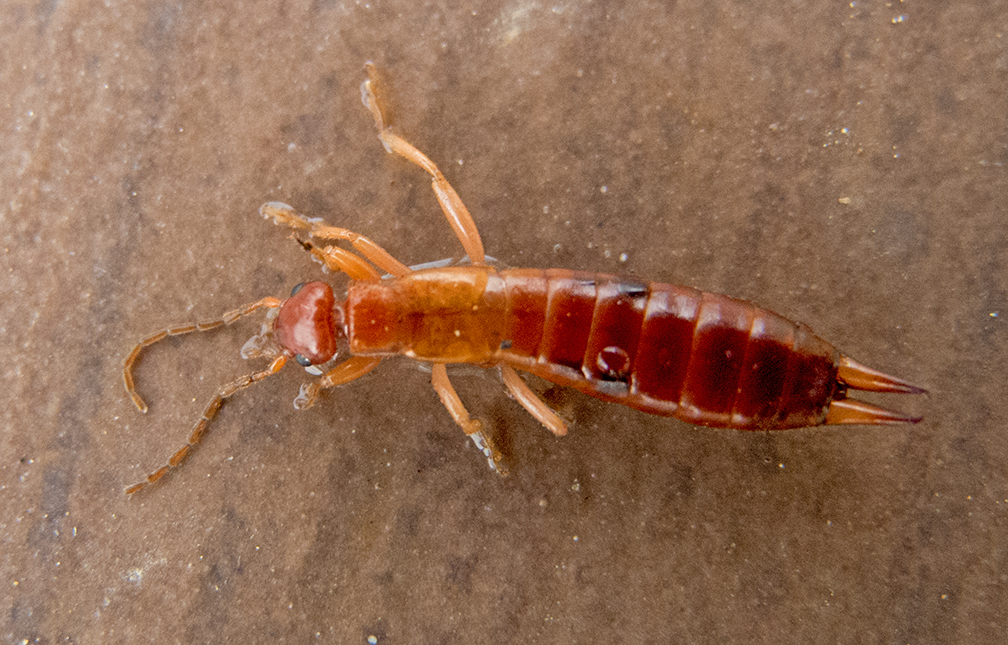

Scientific classification
- Kingdom: Animalia
- Phylum: Arthropoda
- Clade: Pancrustacea
- Class: Insecta
- Order: Dermaptera
- Family: Forficulidae
- Genus: Forficula
- Species: F. aetolica

Binomial name
- Forficula aetolica Brunner, 1882

= Forficula aetolica =

Species of earwig

Forficula aetolica is a species of earwig in the family Forficulidae. They can be found in the Palearctic realm, especially Turkey, Greece, Cyprus, and Ukraine.
