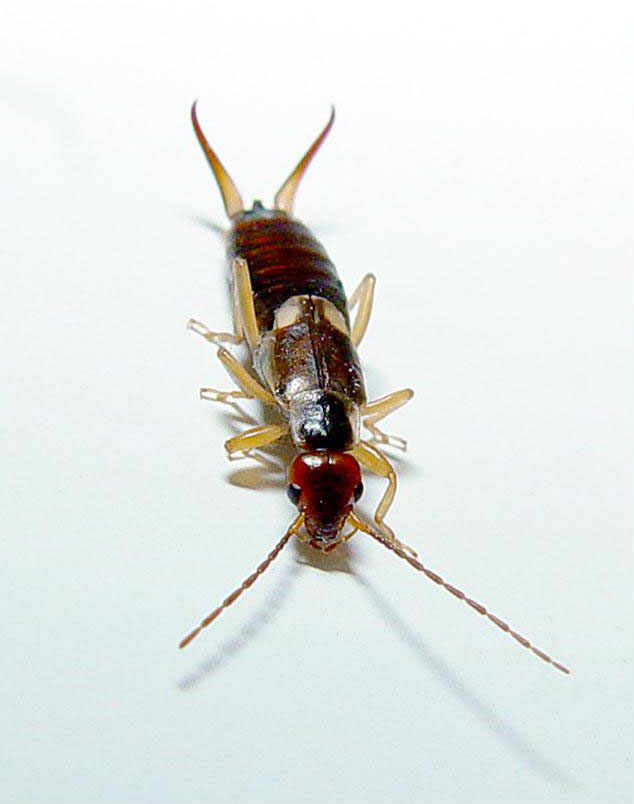
- Forficula auricularia

Scientific classification
- Kingdom: Animalia
- Phylum: Arthropoda
- Clade: Pancrustacea
- Class: Insecta
- Order: Dermaptera
- Family: Forficulidae
- Subfamily: Forficulinae
- Genus: Forficula; Linnaeus, 1758

Species
- See text

= Forficula =

Genus of earwigs

Forficula is a genus of earwigs in the family Forficulidae; it was first described in 1758 by Swedish biologist Carl Linnaeus in the 10th edition of Systema Naturae. The name Forficula is Latin for earwig, formerly small pinchers. The genus spans all continents except Antarctica and is native to Afro-Eurasia, primarily Europe. The best known species is Forficula auricularia and is a common household pest.

== Gallery ==
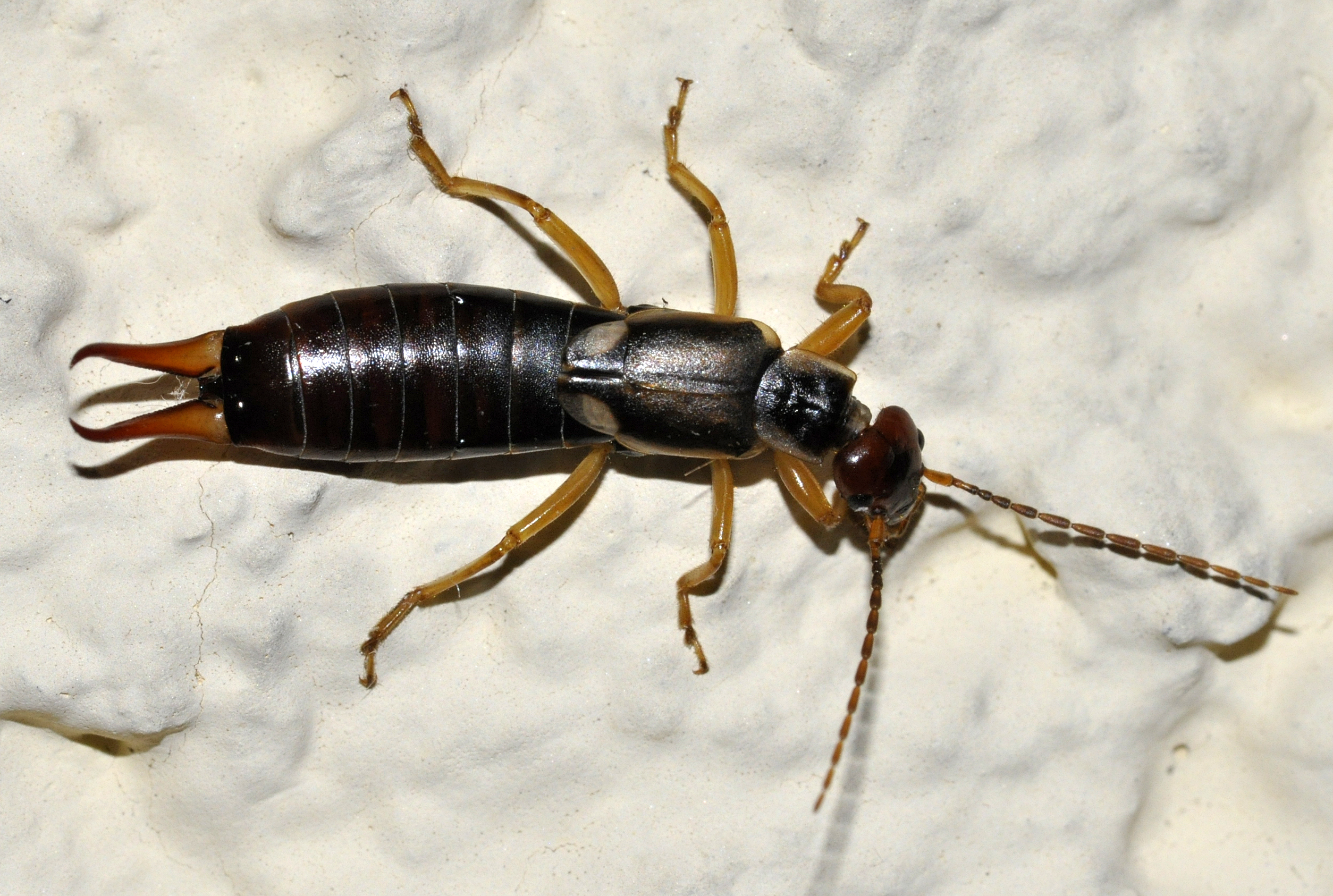
Forficula auricularia

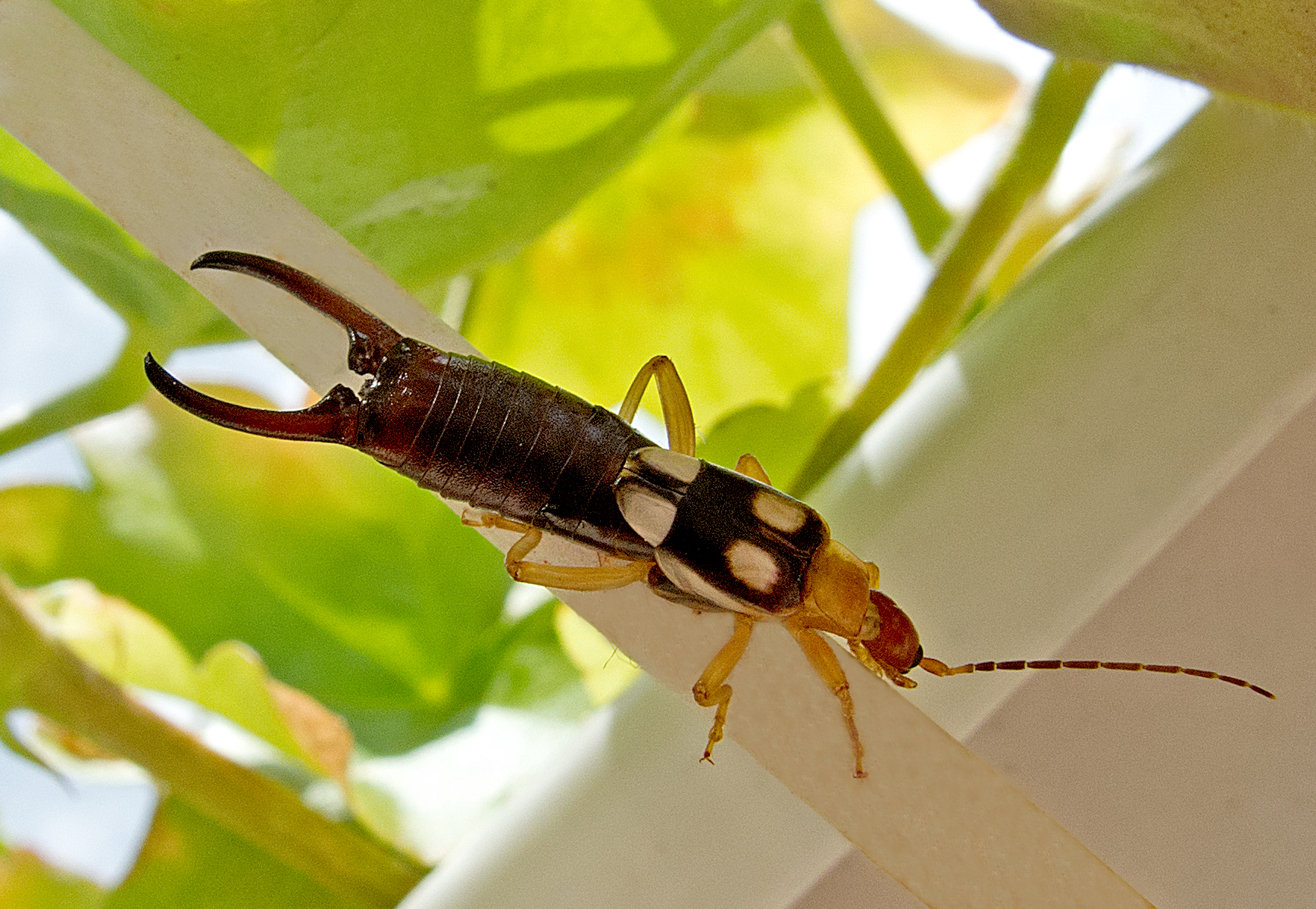
Forficula smyrnensis

== Species ==
The genus Forficula contains at least 68 species, making it the largest genus of earwigs. Some species are listed below:

- Forficula abrutiana
- Forficula aetolica
- Forficula aeolica
- Forficula auricularia
- Forficula apennina
- Forficula davidi
- Forficula decipiens
- Forficula dentata
- Forficula greeni
- Forficula harberei
- Forficula iberica
- Forficula laeviforceps
- Forficula lesnei
- Forficula lucasi
- Forficula lurida
- Forficula mediterranea
- Forficula mikado
- Forficula planicollis
- Forficula pubescens
- Forficula riffensis
- Forficula ruficollis
- Forficula scudderi
- Forficula silana
- Forficula smyrnensis
- Forficula tomis
- Forficula vicaria
- Forficula vilmi
- †Forficula paleocaenica (fossil)
