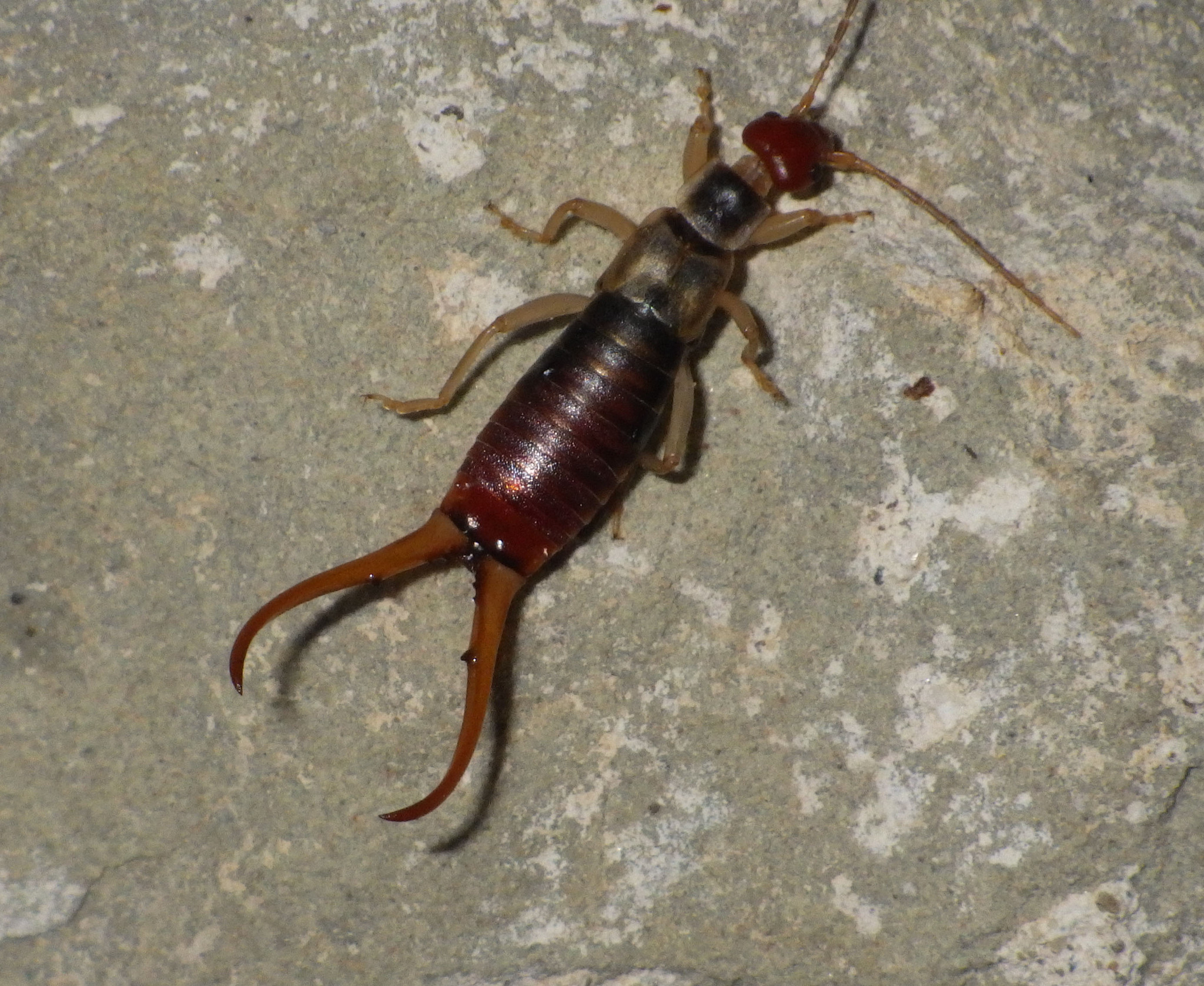

Scientific classification
- Kingdom: Animalia
- Phylum: Arthropoda
- Class: Insecta
- Order: Dermaptera
- Family: Forficulidae
- Genus: Forficula
- Species: F. silana

Binomial name
- Forficula silana Costa, 1881

= Forficula silana =

Species of earwig

Forficula silana is a species of earwig in the family Forficulidae.
