= Nederby (Fur) =

- Village
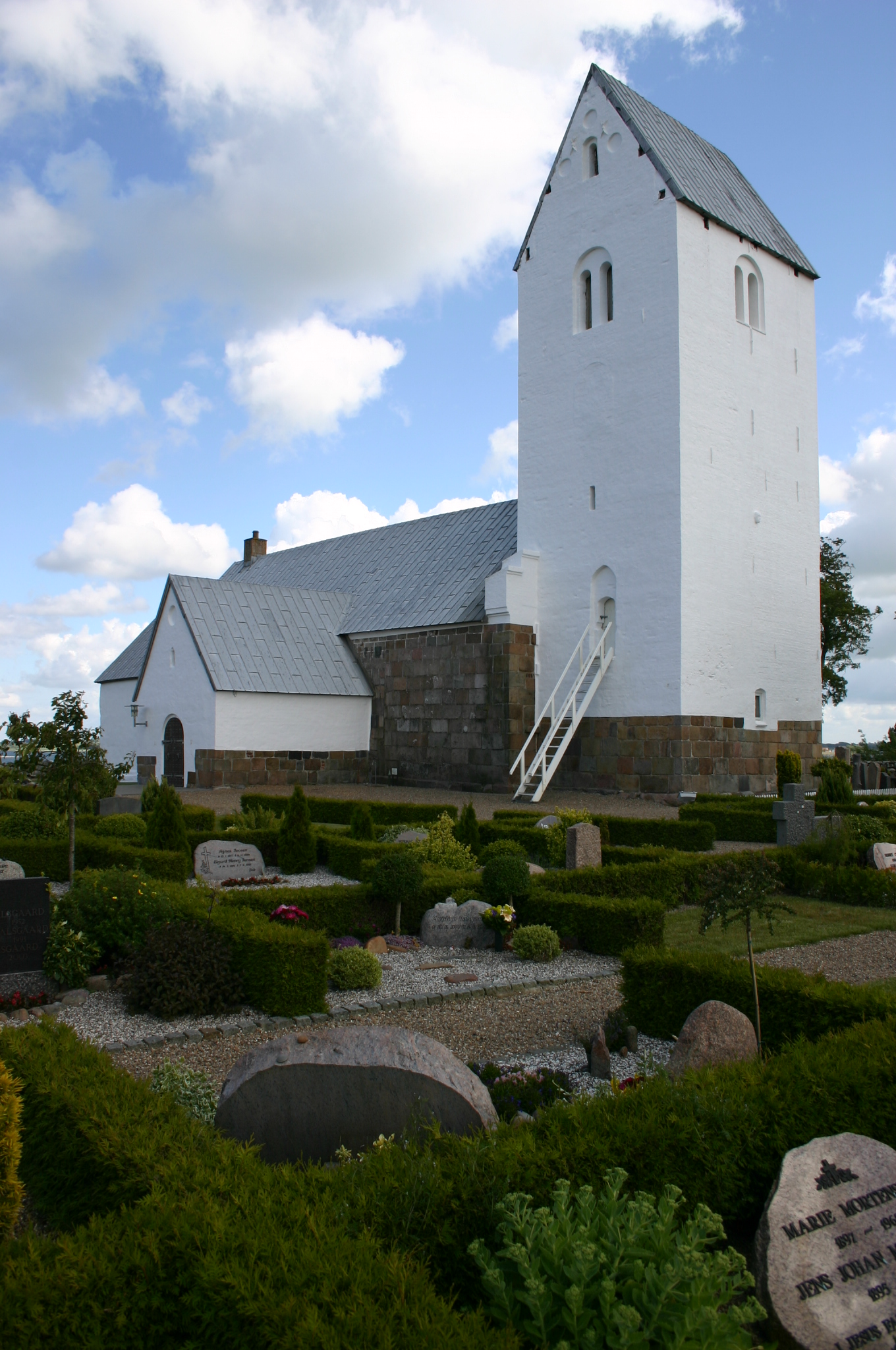
- Fur Church in Nederby

- Location in Central Denmark Region Nederby (Denmark)
- Coordinates: 56°48′56″N 9°1′30″E
- Country: Denmark
- Region: Central Denmark (Midtjyllland)
- Municipality: Skive Municipality
- Parish: Fur Parish

Population (2026)
  - Total: 532

Nederby is a village on the island of Fur in the Limfjord north of Salling in Denmark. It had a population of 532 (1 January 2026).

Fur Church and Fur Museum are located in the village.

Fur Færgekro (Fur Ferry Inn) is an inn located in the ferry port of Stenøre, in the southern part of Nederby.
