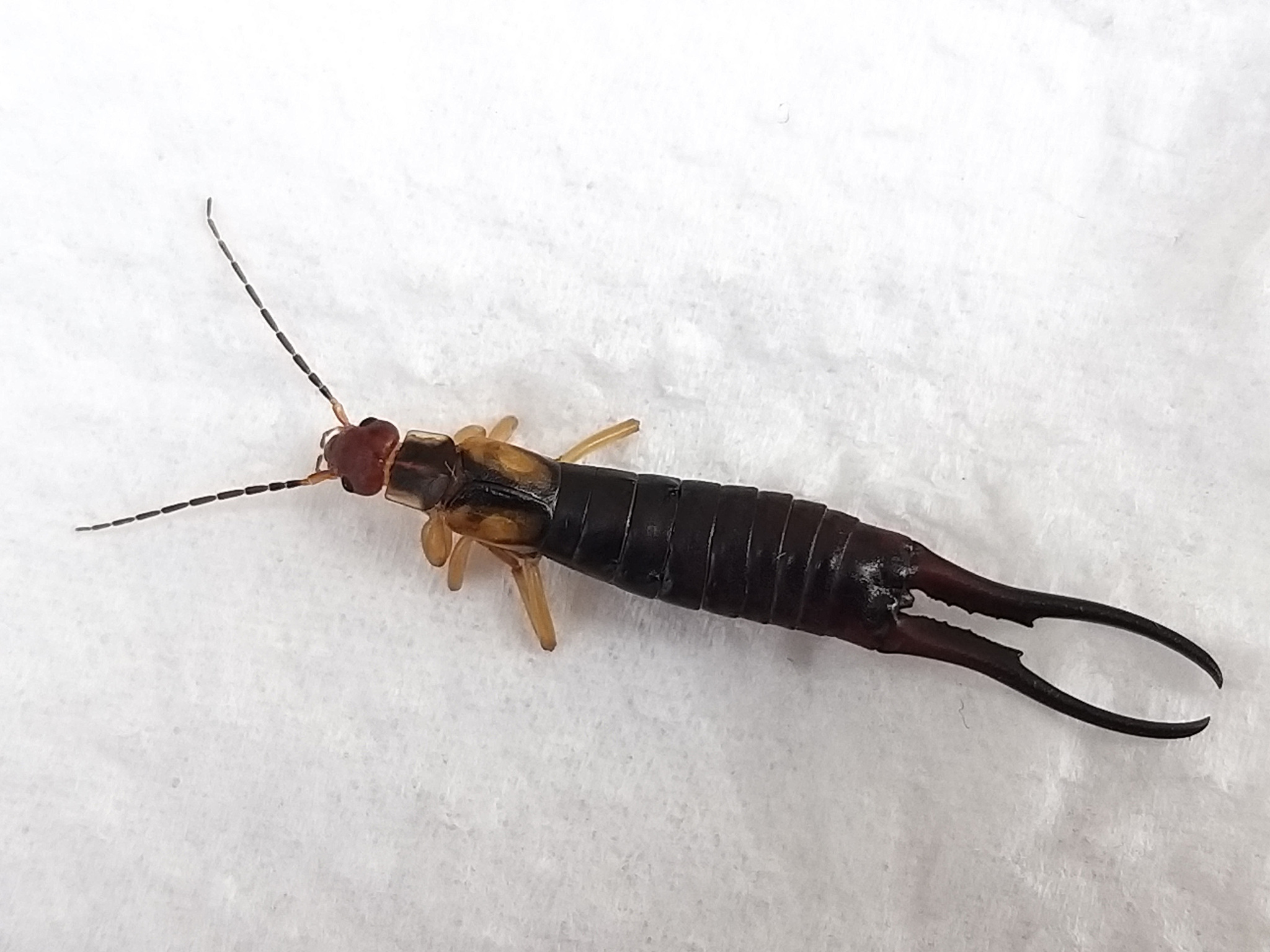

Scientific classification
- Domain: Eukaryota
- Kingdom: Animalia
- Phylum: Arthropoda
- Class: Insecta
- Order: Dermaptera
- Family: Forficulidae
- Genus: Forficula
- Species: F. tomis

Binomial name
- Forficula tomis Kolenati, 1846

= Forficula tomis =

Species of earwig

Forficula tomis is a species of earwig in the family Forficulidae.
