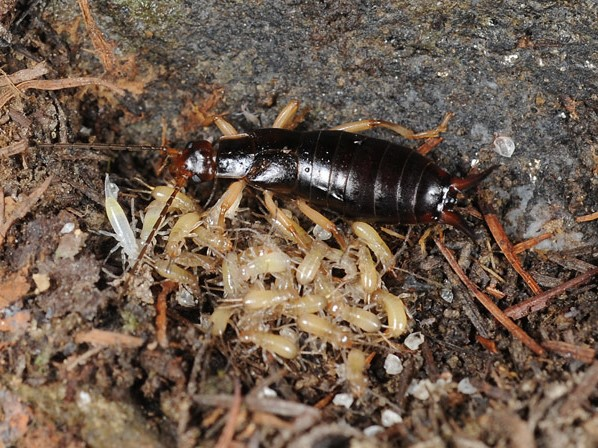

Scientific classification
- Domain: Eukaryota
- Kingdom: Animalia
- Phylum: Arthropoda
- Class: Insecta
- Order: Dermaptera
- Family: Forficulidae
- Genus: Forficula
- Species: F. scudderi

Binomial name
- Forficula scudderi Bormans

= Forficula scudderi =

Species of earwig

Forficula scudderi is a species of earwig in the family Forficulidae.
