= Forficula mediterranea =

Scientific classification
- Kingdom: Animalia
- Phylum: Arthropoda
- Clade: Pancrustacea
- Class: Insecta
- Order: Dermaptera
- Family: Forficulidae
- Genus: Forficula
- Species: F. mediterranea

Binomial name
- Forficula mediterranea González-Miguéns & García-París, 2020

Species of insect

Forficula mediterranea is a species of earwig in the family Forficulidae and in the cryptic Forficula auricularia species complex. It was formally described by González-Miguéns & García-París in 2020.

The distribution of F. mediterranea includes eastern and southern Spain, Morocco, Sardinia, Sicily, and from Baja California to Southern California. In California, F. mediterranea is found in San Diego, Riverside, Orange, Los Angeles, San Bernardino, Kern, Santa Barbara, and San Luis Obispo Counties. It overlaps in population with Forficula dentata in the latter two counties.
