= Forficula abrutiana =

Scientific classification
- Kingdom: Animalia
- Phylum: Arthropoda
- Clade: Pancrustacea
- Class: Insecta
- Order: Dermaptera
- Family: Forficulidae
- Genus: Forficula
- Species: F. abrutiana

Binomial name
- Forficula abrutiana Borelli, 1916

Species of earwig

Forficula abrutiana is a species of earwig in the family Forficulidae. They can be found in the Palearctic realm, especially in Italy.
