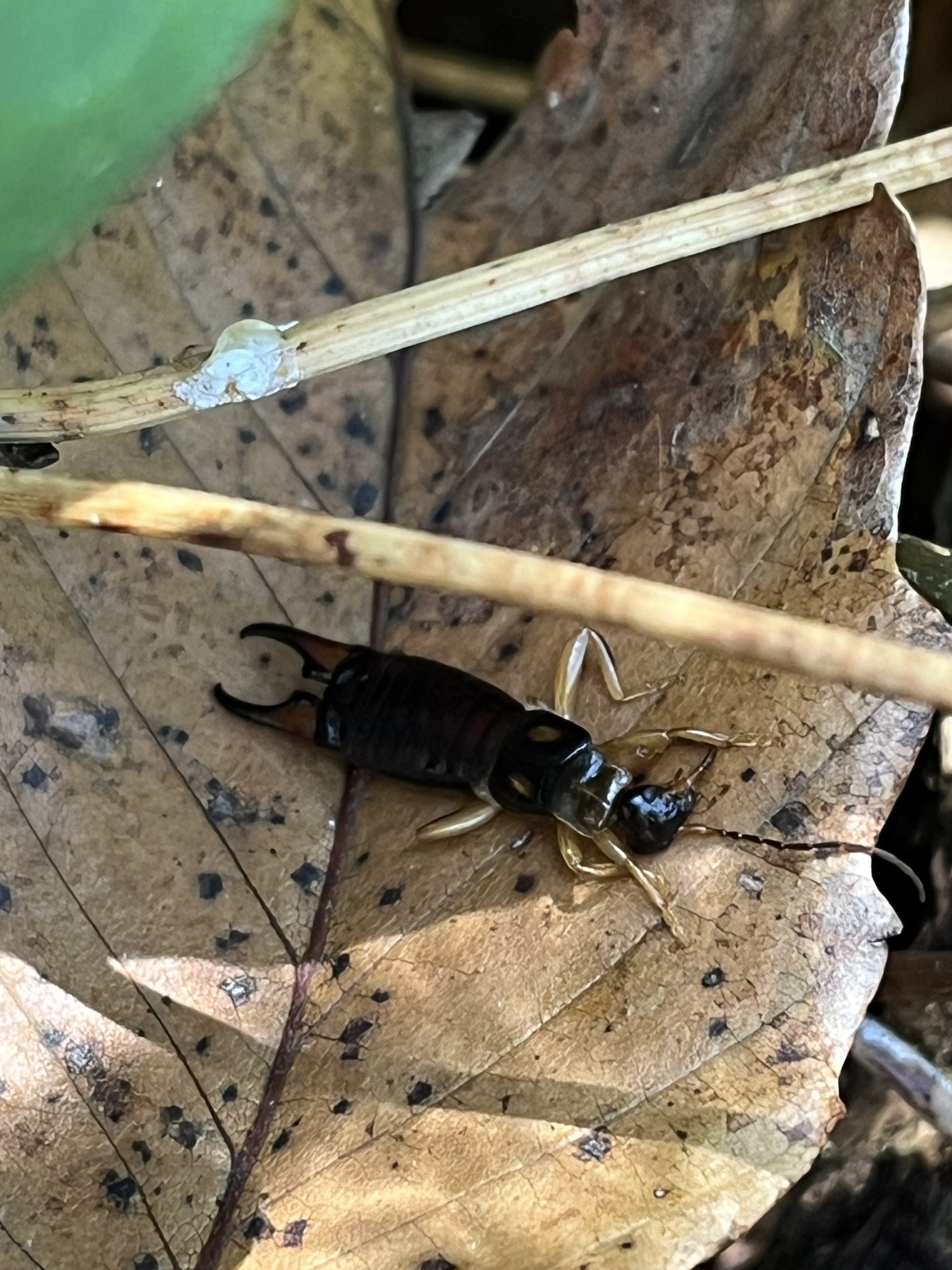
- Forficula ruficollis in Portugal

Scientific classification
- Kingdom: Animalia
- Phylum: Arthropoda
- Clade: Pancrustacea
- Class: Insecta
- Order: Dermaptera
- Family: Forficulidae
- Genus: Forficula
- Species: F. ruficollis

Binomial name
- Forficula ruficollis Fabricius, 1798

= Forficula ruficollis =

Species of earwig

Forficula ruficollis is a species of earwig in the family Forficulidae. They can be found in regions of Spain, Portugal, Algeria, Morocco, and France.
