= Forficula davidi =

Scientific classification
- Kingdom: Animalia
- Phylum: Arthropoda
- Clade: Pancrustacea
- Class: Insecta
- Order: Dermaptera
- Family: Forficulidae
- Genus: Forficula
- Species: F. davidi

Binomial name
- Forficula davidi Burr, 1905

Species of earwig

Forficula davidi is a species of earwig.
