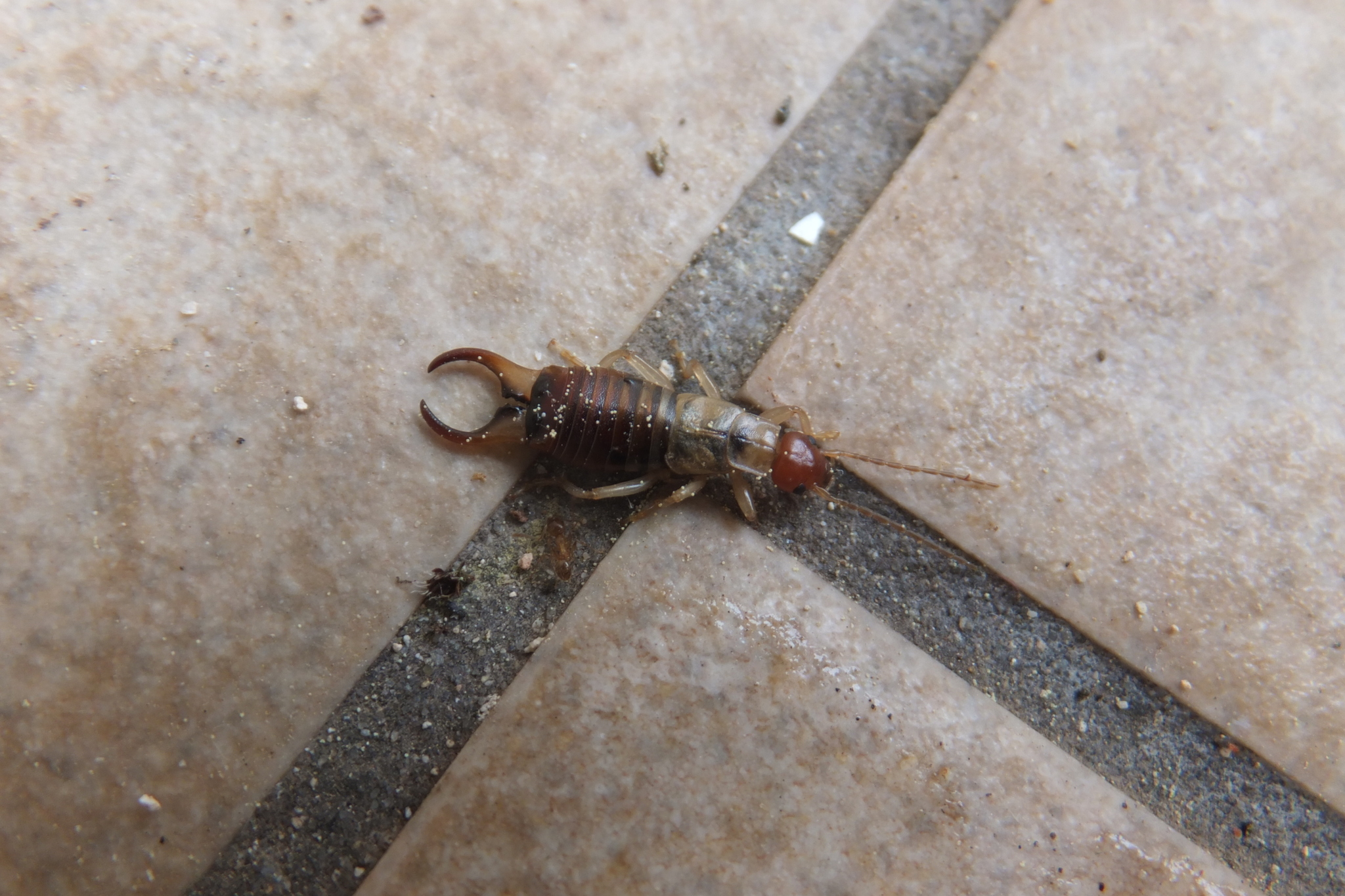
- male

Scientific classification
- Domain: Eukaryota
- Kingdom: Animalia
- Phylum: Arthropoda
- Class: Insecta
- Order: Dermaptera
- Family: Forficulidae
- Genus: Forficula
- Species: F. decipiens

Binomial name
- Forficula decipiens Gené, 1832

Synonyms
- Forficula brevis Rambur (1838); Forficula pallidicornis Brulle (1832); Forficula laminigera Costa (1881); Forficula decipiens var. cyclolabia and var. macrolabia Fieber (1853)

= Forficula decipiens =

Species of earwig

Forficula decipiens is a species of earwig in the family Forficulidae.

== Description ==
Forficula decipiens can reach a length (forceps included) of 15–19 millimetres (0.59–0.75 in) in both sexes. Head is yellowish orange, pronotum, tegmina and legs are yellowish, while the abdomen is reddish brown.

== Distribution ==
This species is present in South Europe (Portugal, Spain, France, Italy, Greece, Montenegro and Romania), Asia Minor, and in North Africa.
