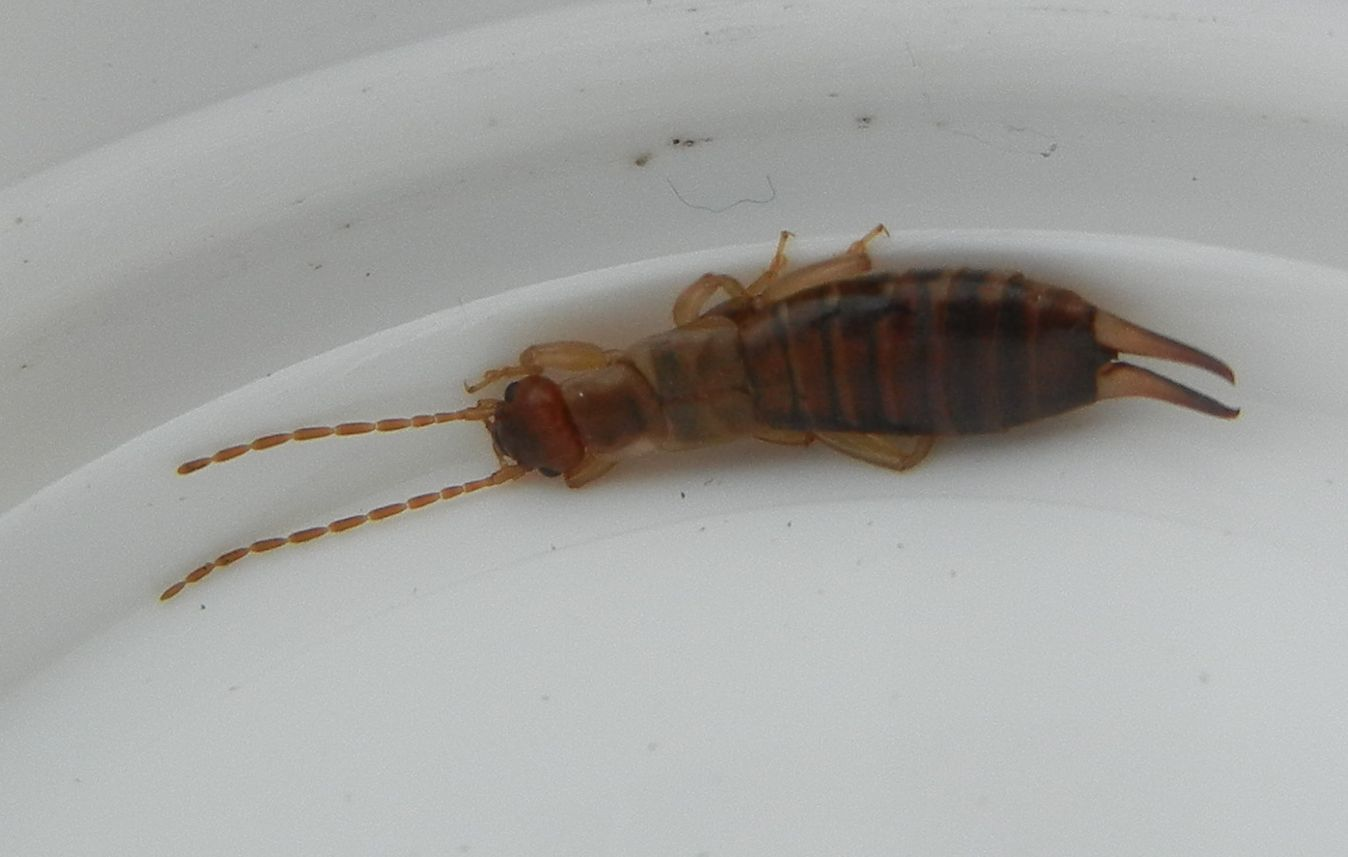

Scientific classification
- Domain: Eukaryota
- Kingdom: Animalia
- Phylum: Arthropoda
- Class: Insecta
- Order: Dermaptera
- Family: Forficulidae
- Genus: Forficula
- Species: F. lesnei

Binomial name
- Forficula lesnei (Finot, 1887)

= Forficula lesnei =

Species of earwig

Forficula lesnei, or Lesne's earwig, is a species of earwig from Europe, particularly Britain. Compared to the common earwig, Lesne's earwig is shorter, with a body length around 8 mm (0.31 in). It also lacks hind wings. It can be found dwelling on the shrub Clematis vitalba.
