= Forficula laeviforceps =

Scientific classification
- Domain: Eukaryota
- Kingdom: Animalia
- Phylum: Arthropoda
- Class: Insecta
- Order: Dermaptera
- Family: Forficulidae
- Genus: Forficula
- Species: F. laeviforceps

Binomial name
- Forficula laeviforceps Chopard, 1938

Species of earwig

Forficula laeviforceps is a species of earwig.
