= Forficula iberica =

Scientific classification
- Domain: Eukaryota
- Kingdom: Animalia
- Phylum: Arthropoda
- Class: Insecta
- Order: Dermaptera
- Family: Forficulidae
- Genus: Forficula
- Species: F. iberica

Binomial name
- Forficula iberica Steinmann, 1981

Species of earwig

Forficula iberica is a species of earwig in the family Forficulidae.
