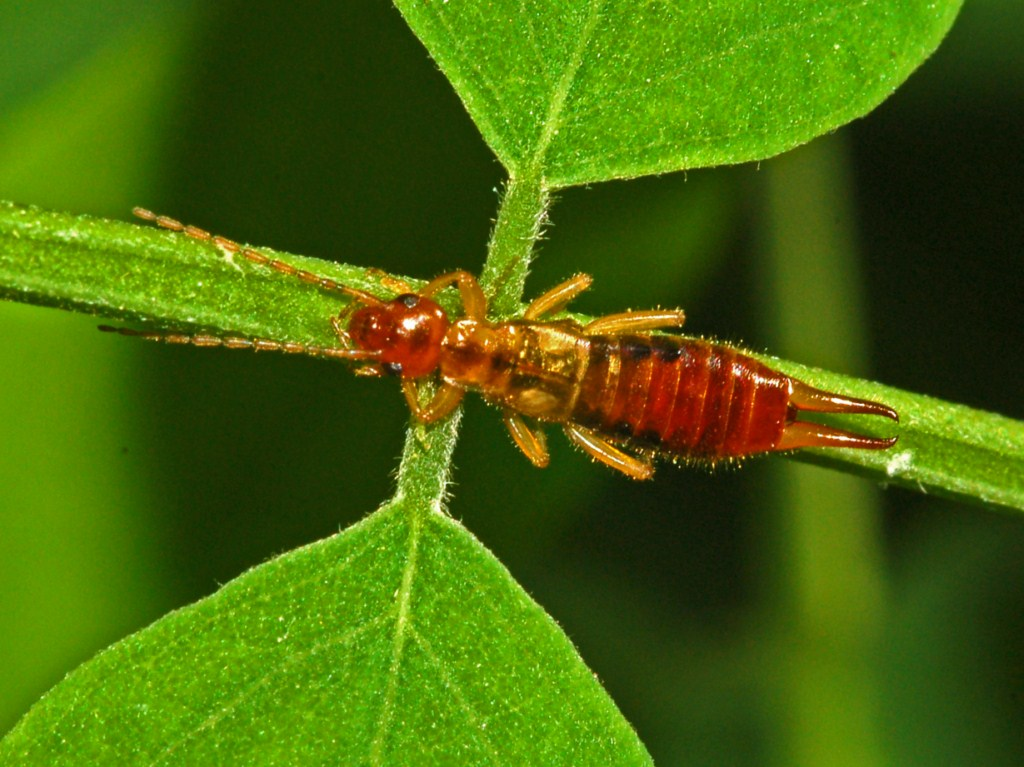
- Forficula cf. pubescens, female

Scientific classification
- Domain: Eukaryota
- Kingdom: Animalia
- Phylum: Arthropoda
- Class: Insecta
- Order: Dermaptera
- Family: Forficulidae
- Genus: Forficula
- Species: F. pubescens

Binomial name
- Forficula pubescens Serville, 1839

Synonyms
- Guanchia pubescens (Géné, 1837)

= Forficula pubescens =

Species of earwig

Forficula pubescens is a species of earwig.

== Distribution ==
This species a Mediterranean-Macaronesian distribution. It can be found in North Africa, France, Italy, Macaronesia and the Iberian Peninsula.

== Bibliography ==
- Augusto Vigna Taglianti, « I Dermatteri di Sardegna (Dermaptera) », Matériaux entomocénotiques, vol. 5, 2011, p. 269–285.
- Jean-François Debras, Audrey Dussaud, René Rieux et Thierry Dutoit, « Recherche prospective sur le rôle « source » des haies en production fruitière intégrée. Le cas des perce-oreilles : Forficula auricularia L. et Forficula pubescens Gené », Comptes Rendus Biologies, Elsevier, vol. 330, no 9, 2007, p. 664–673 (ISSN 1631-0691, DOI 10.1016/j.crvi.2007.07.003
- Yoann Braud, Éric Sardet et Didier Morin, « Actualisation du catalogue des Orthoptéroïdes de l’île de Corse (France) », Matériaux entomocénotiques, ASCETE, vol. 7, 2002, p. 5-22
