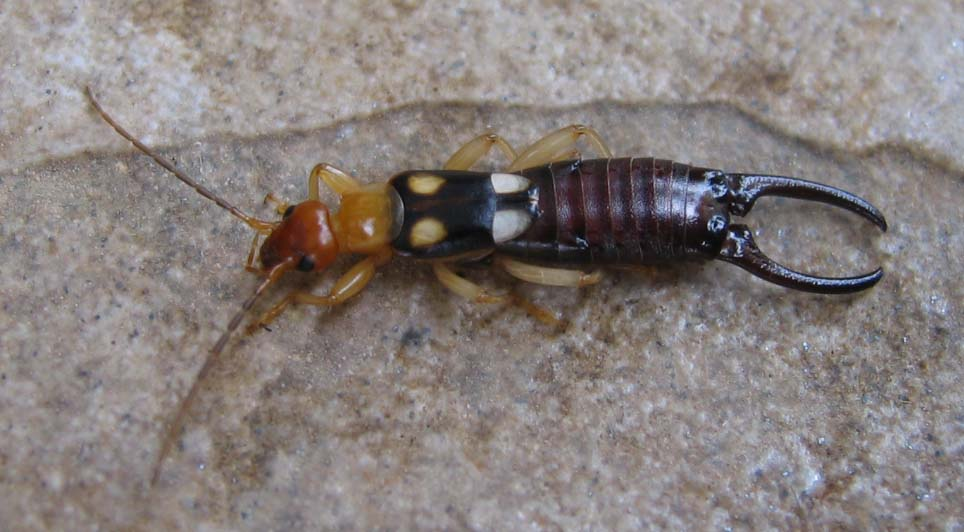

Scientific classification
- Domain: Eukaryota
- Kingdom: Animalia
- Phylum: Arthropoda
- Class: Insecta
- Order: Dermaptera
- Family: Forficulidae
- Genus: Forficula
- Species: F. smyrnensis

Binomial name
- Forficula smyrnensis Audinet-Serville, 1839

= Forficula smyrnensis =

Species of earwig

Forficula smyrnensis is a species of earwig in the family Forficulidae. It is mostly found in the Palearctic realm.
