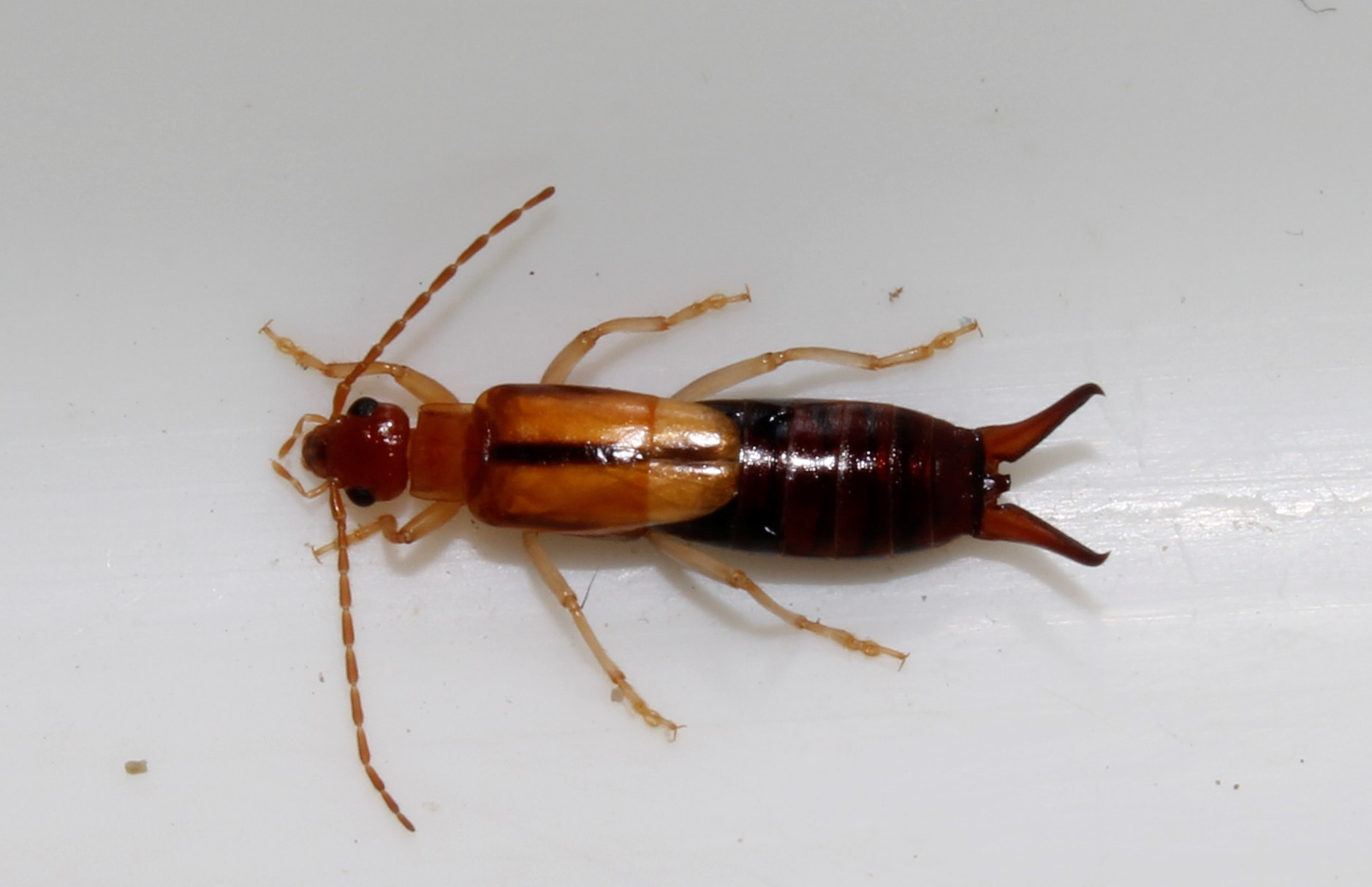

Scientific classification
- Domain: Eukaryota
- Kingdom: Animalia
- Phylum: Arthropoda
- Class: Insecta
- Order: Dermaptera
- Family: Forficulidae
- Genus: Forficula
- Species: F. lucasi

Binomial name
- Forficula lucasi Dohrn, 1865

= Forficula lucasi =

Species of earwig

Forficula lucasi is a species of earwig found in Africa and has been introduced to Greece.
