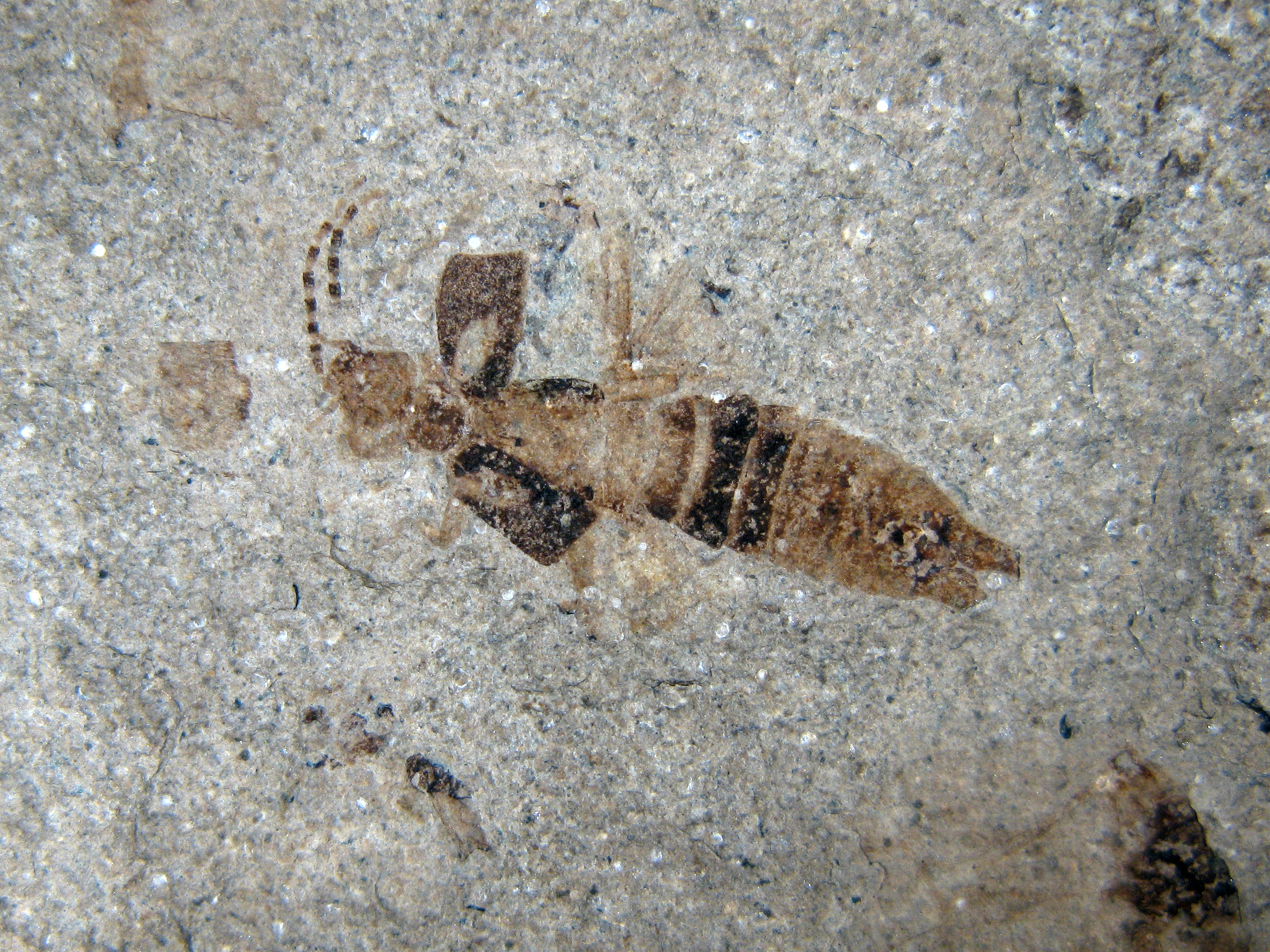

Scientific classification
- Kingdom: Animalia
- Phylum: Arthropoda
- Class: Insecta
- Order: Dermaptera
- Family: Forficulidae
- Genus: Forficula
- Species: †F. paleocaenica

Binomial name
- †Forficula paleocaenica Willmann, 1990

= Forficula paleocaenica =

Extinct species of earwig

Forficula paleocaenica, is a fossil species of earwigs, of the family Forficulidae. It was found in Denmark, dating to the Eocene.
