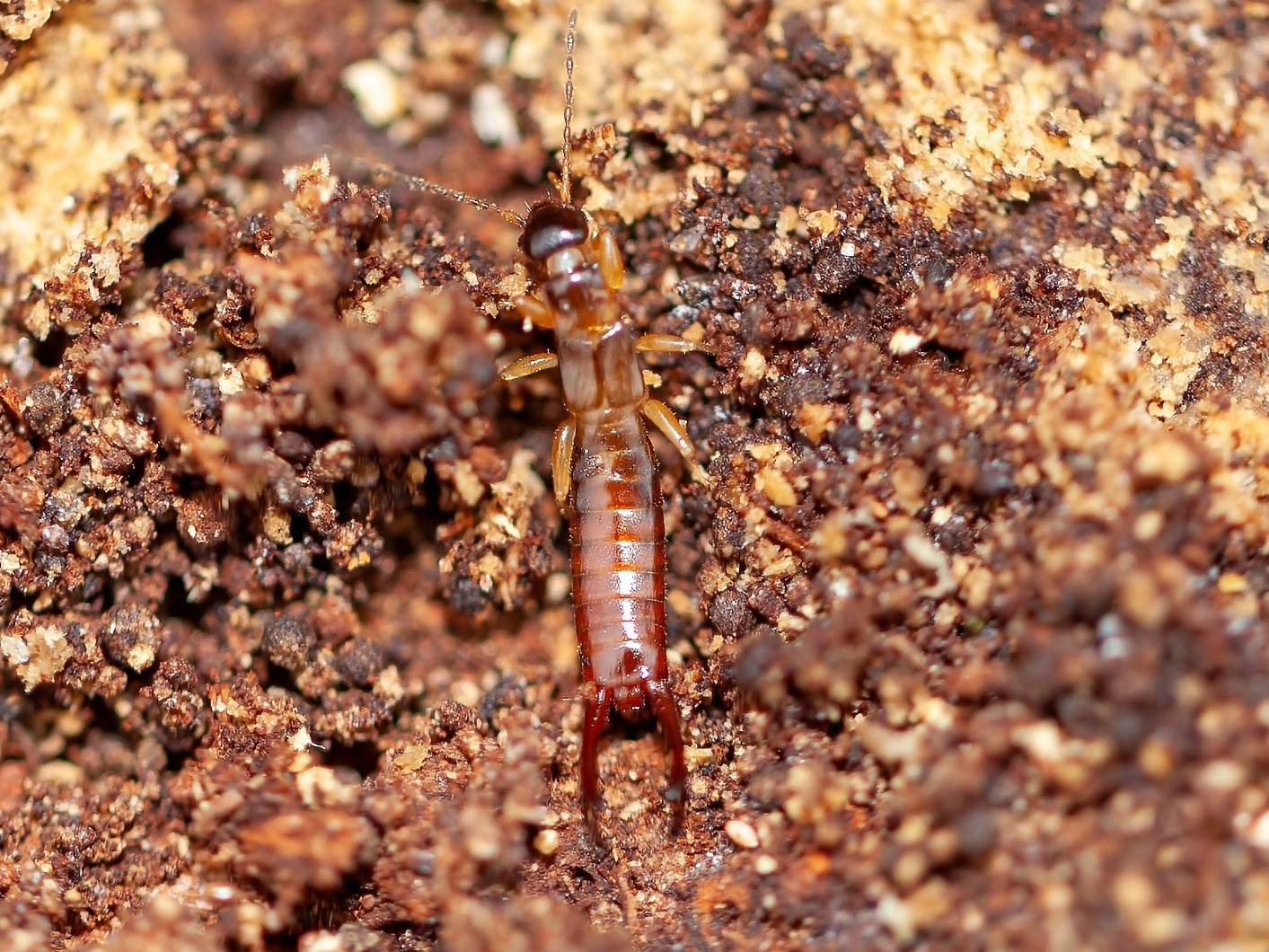

Scientific classification
- Domain: Eukaryota
- Kingdom: Animalia
- Phylum: Arthropoda
- Class: Insecta
- Order: Dermaptera
- Family: Spongiphoridae
- Genus: Marava
- Species: M. pulchella

Binomial name
- Marava pulchella (Audinet-Serville, 1838)

= Marava pulchella =

Species of earwig

Marava pulchella is a species of earwig in the family Spongiphoridae. It is found in the Caribbean and North America.
