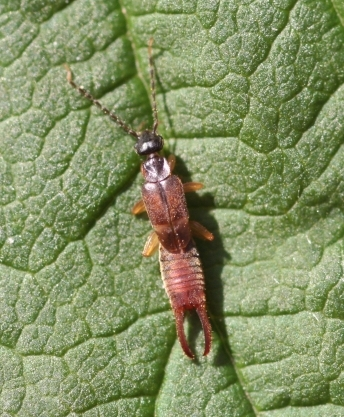
- Labia minor

Scientific classification
- Domain: Eukaryota
- Kingdom: Animalia
- Phylum: Arthropoda
- Class: Insecta
- Order: Dermaptera
- Family: Spongiphoridae
- Subfamily: Labiinae; Burr, 1909

Genera
- See text

= Labiinae =

Family of earwigs

Labiinae, whose members are commonly known as little earwigs, is a moderately sized subfamily of earwigs in the family Spongiphoridae. It is a cosmopolitan family, whose members are small, winged earwigs, generally less than 1.5 centimetres (0.59 in) in length.

== Genera ==
This subfamily includes the following genera:

- Chaetolabia Brindle, 1972
- Circolabia Steinmann, 1987
- Isolabella Verhoeff, 1902
- Labia Leach, 1815
- Paralabella Steinmann, 1990
- Paraspania Steinmann, 1985
- Sphingolabis de Bormans, 1883
- Spirolabia Steinmann, 1987
