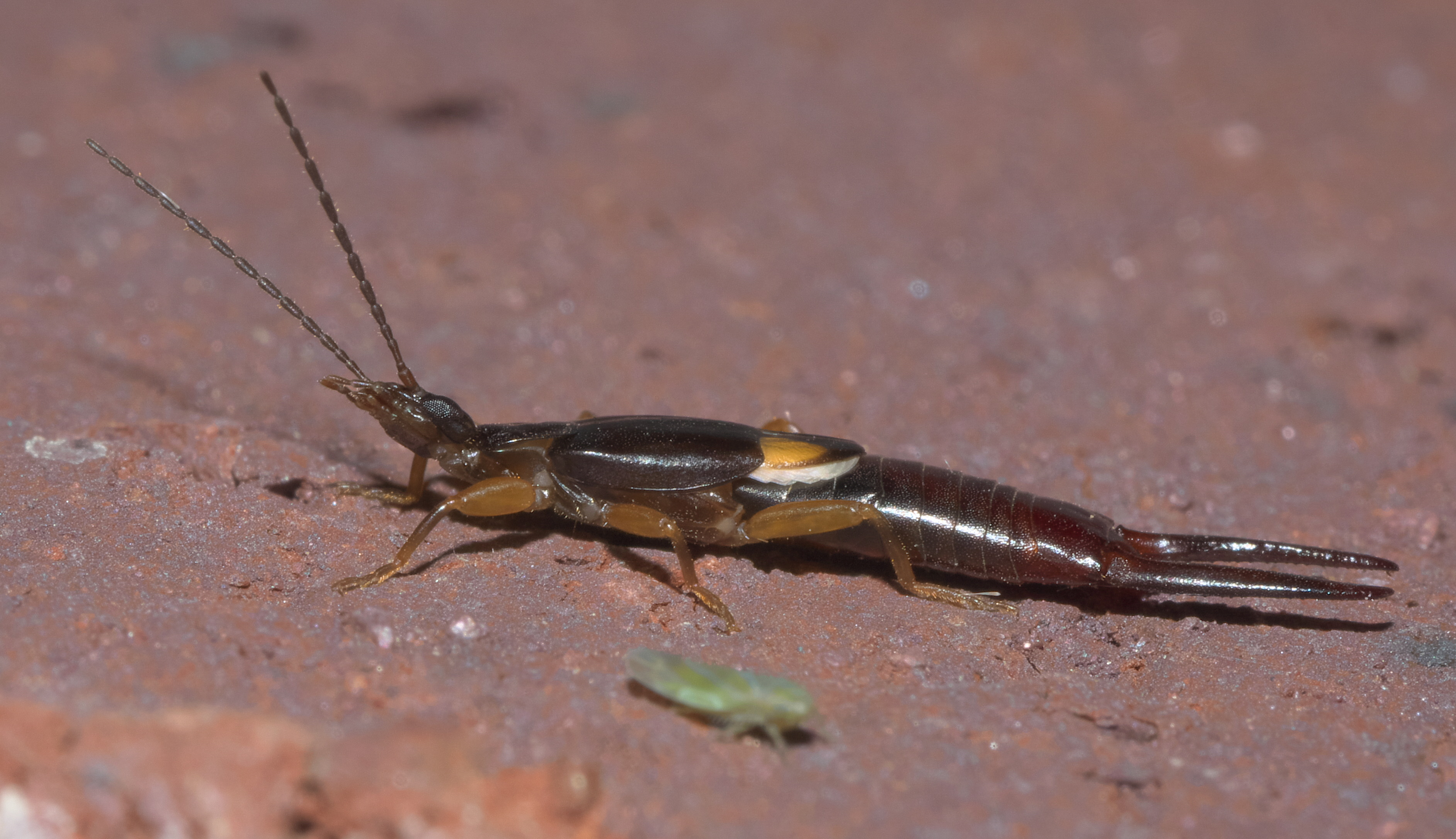

Scientific classification
- Domain: Eukaryota
- Kingdom: Animalia
- Phylum: Arthropoda
- Class: Insecta
- Order: Dermaptera
- Family: Spongiphoridae
- Genus: Vostox
- Species: V. brunneipennis

Binomial name
- Vostox brunneipennis (Audinet-Serville, 1838)

= Vostox brunneipennis =

Species of earwig

Vostox brunneipennis is a species of earwig in the family Spongiphoridae. It is found throughout the Americas.

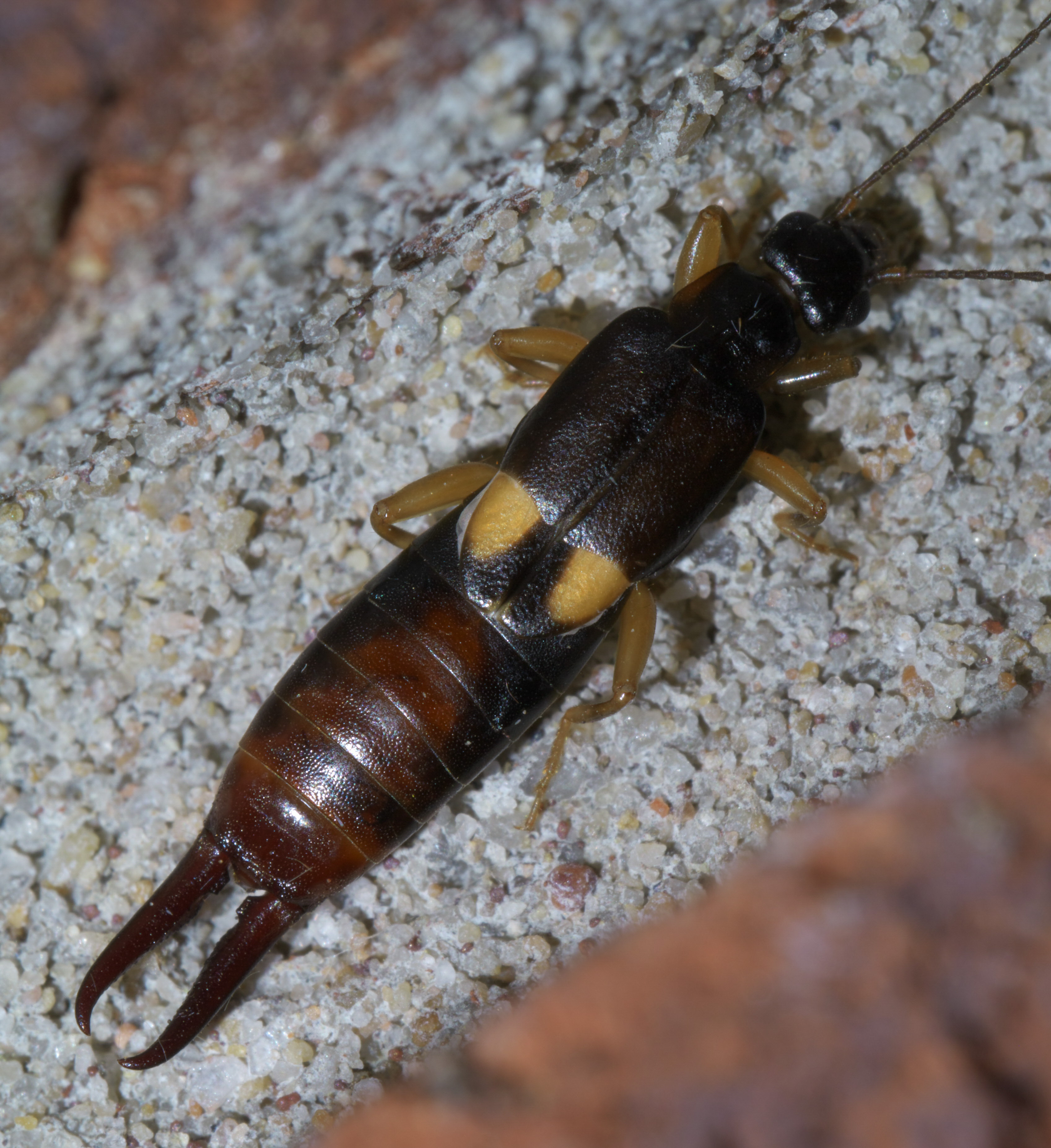

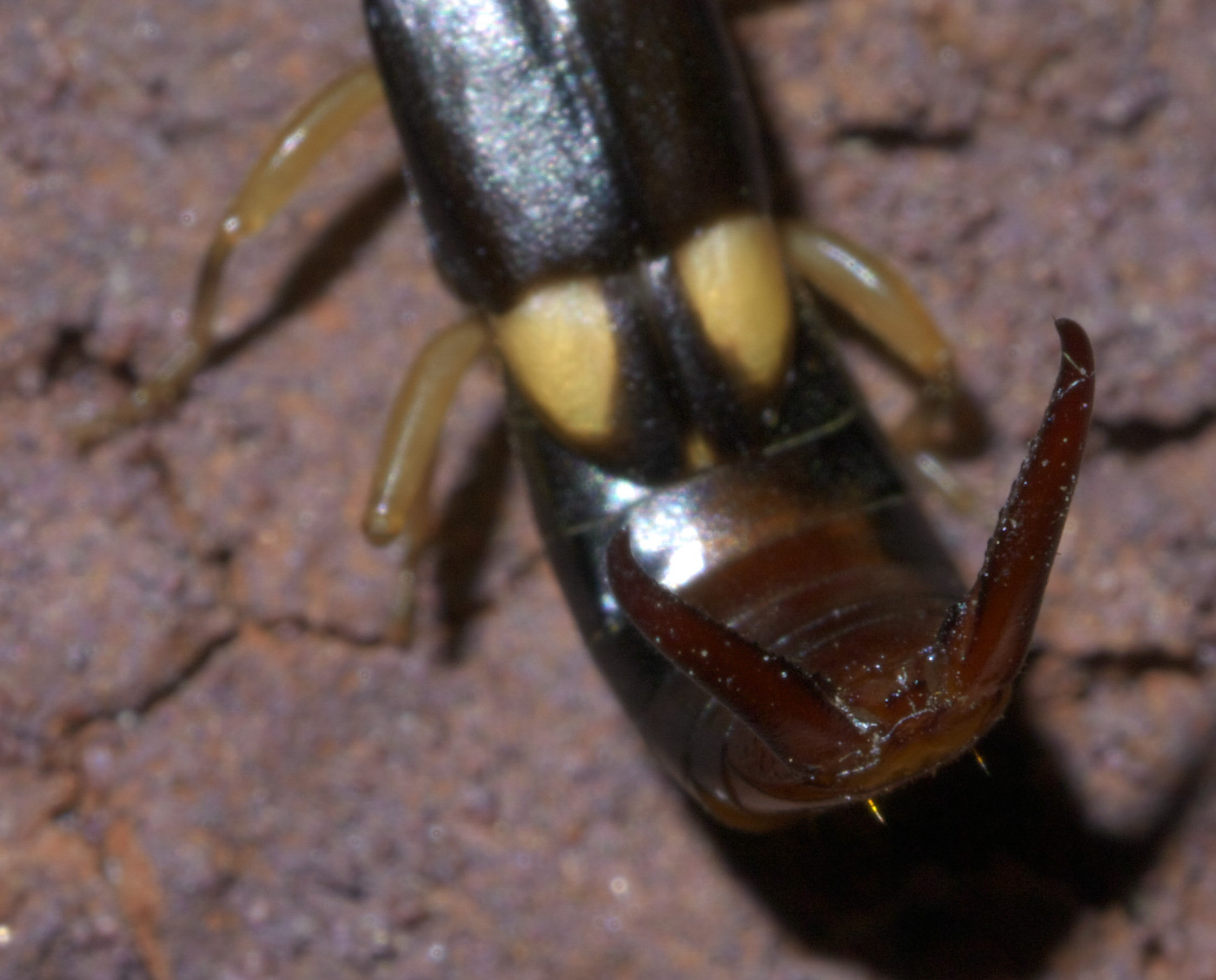
