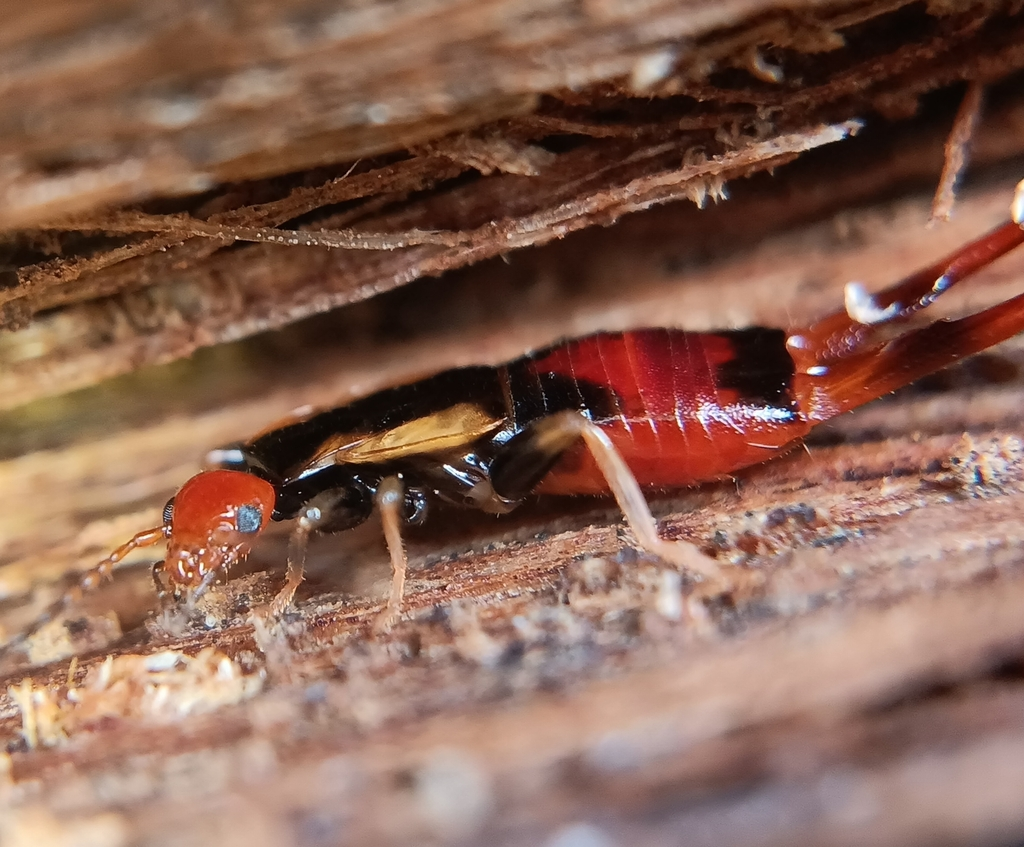

Scientific classification
- Domain: Eukaryota
- Kingdom: Animalia
- Phylum: Arthropoda
- Class: Insecta
- Order: Dermaptera
- Family: Spongiphoridae
- Genus: Nesogaster
- Species: N. aculeatus

Binomial name
- Nesogaster aculeatus (de Bormans, 1900)

= Nesogaster aculeatus =

Species of earwig

Nesogaster aculeatus is a species of earwig in the family Spongiphoridae. It is native to the Philippines, New Guinea, and Australia.

== Description ==
Nesogaster aculeatus in its main form is identified by its red head, segmented antenne then roach like joiner. The abdomen is rectangular. On the back of the black abdomen is reddish V pattern. The back spikes are red.

The subspecies Nesogaster aculeatus apoensis is identified by a yellow line and a more square joiner. the back is red and the black is reversed in the pattern. the back spikes are joined and dark red.
