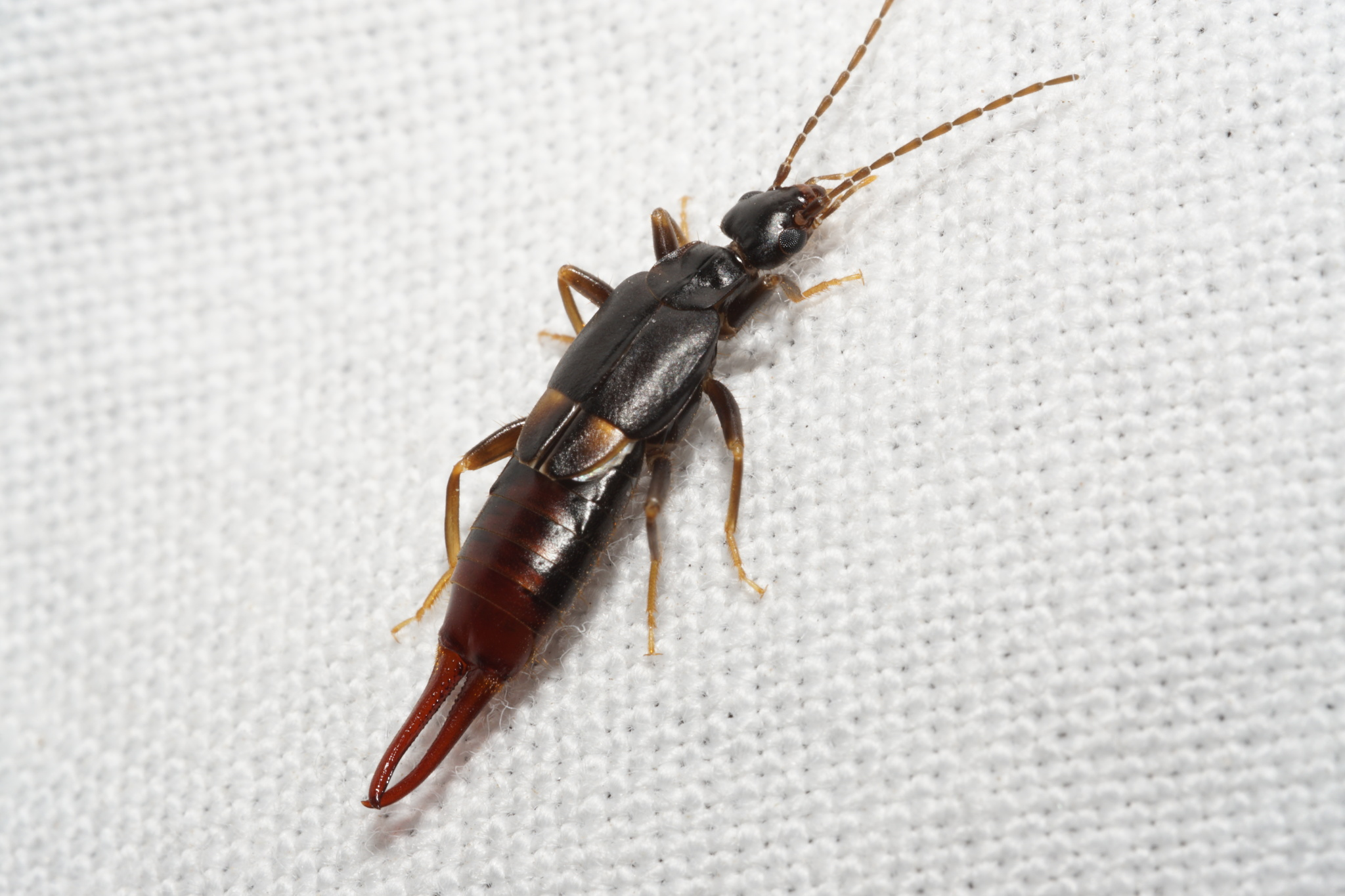

Scientific classification
- Kingdom: Animalia
- Phylum: Arthropoda
- Class: Insecta
- Order: Dermaptera
- Family: Spongiphoridae
- Genus: Vostox
- Species: V. apicedentatus

Binomial name
- Vostox apicedentatus (Caudell, 1904)

= Vostox apicedentatus =

Species of earwig

Vostox apicedentatus, the toothed earwig, is a species of earwig in the family Spongiphoridae. It is found in Central America and North America.
