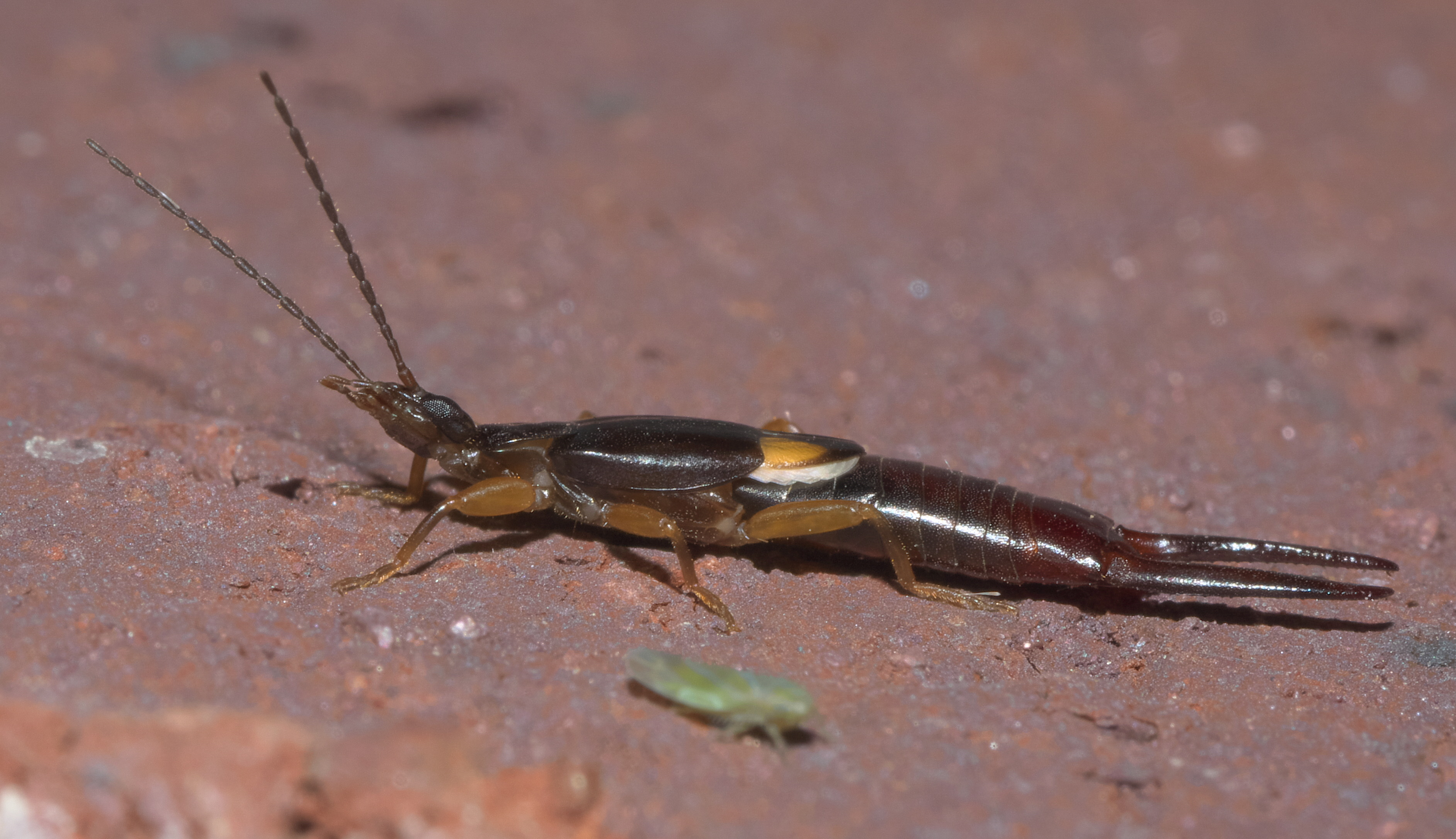
- Vostox brunneipennis

Scientific classification
- Domain: Eukaryota
- Kingdom: Animalia
- Phylum: Arthropoda
- Class: Insecta
- Order: Dermaptera
- Superfamily: Forficuloidea
- Family: Spongiphoridae
- Subfamily: Spongiphorinae; Verhoeff, 1902

Synonyms
- Homataginae Srivastava, 1985; Irdexinaea Srivastava, 1985; Irdicinae Srivastava, 1985

= Spongiphorinae =

Subfamily of earwigs

The Spongiphorinae are a medium-sized subfamily of earwigs in the superfamily Forficuloidea, sometimes called "little earwigs", erected by Karl Wilhelm Verhoeff in 1902. Distribution records appear to be incomplete, but genera such as Spongiphora (the type genus) originate from the Americas including the Caribbean; certain species such as Marava arachidis, have a cosmopolitan distribution.

== Genera ==
The Dermaptera Species File lists:

1. Filolabia Steinmann, 1989
2. Formicilabia Rehn & Hebard, 1917
3. Homotages Burr, 1909
4. Irdex Burr, 1911
5. Marava Burr, 1911
6. Pseudomarava Steinmann, 1989
7. Purex Burr, 1911
8. Spongiphora Audinet-Serville, 1831
9. Spongovostox Burr, 1911
10. Vostox Burr, 1911
