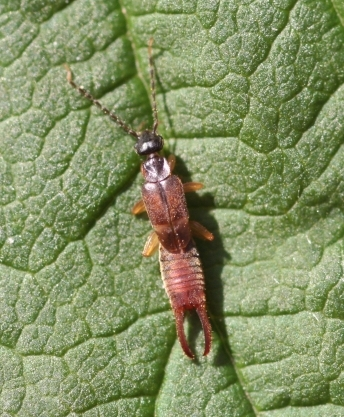
- Labia minor

Scientific classification
- Domain: Eukaryota
- Kingdom: Animalia
- Phylum: Arthropoda
- Class: Insecta
- Order: Dermaptera
- Family: Spongiphoridae
- Subfamily: Labiinae
- Genus: Labia; Leach, 1815

= Labia (earwig) =

Genus of earwigs

Labia is a genus of earwigs belonging to the family Spongiphoridae.

The genus has almost cosmopolitan distribution.

Species:

- Labia bhaktapurensis Kapoor & AK Shah, 1983
- Labia fanta Steinmann, 1990
- Labia harpya Steinmann, 1990
- Labia minor (Linnaeus, 1758)
- Labia phanduwalensis Kapoor, Bharadwaj & Banerjee, 1971
- Labia pluto Steinmann, 1990
