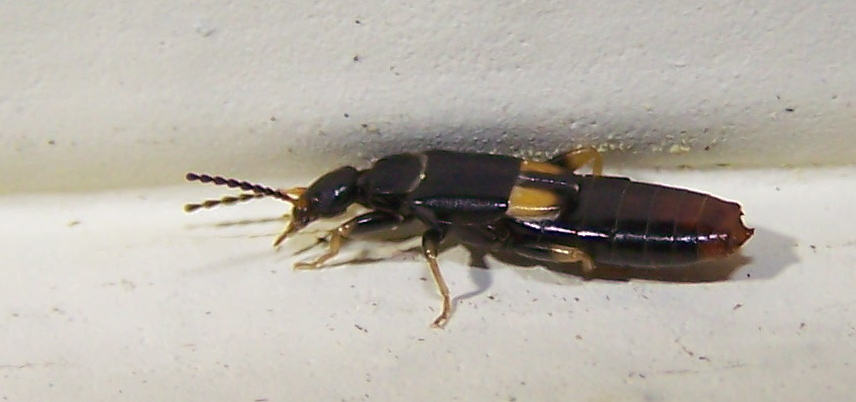

Scientific classification
- Domain: Eukaryota
- Kingdom: Animalia
- Phylum: Arthropoda
- Class: Insecta
- Order: Dermaptera
- Family: Spongiphoridae
- Genus: Marava
- Species: M. arachidis

Binomial name
- Marava arachidis (Yersin, 1860)

= Marava arachidis =

Species of earwig

Marava arachidis is a species of earwig in the family Spongiphoridae. It is found in Africa, Australia, the Caribbean, Europe, Northern Asia (excluding China), North America, South America, and Southern Asia. It inhabits the stems of fennel and females will lay eggs on fennel leaves.
