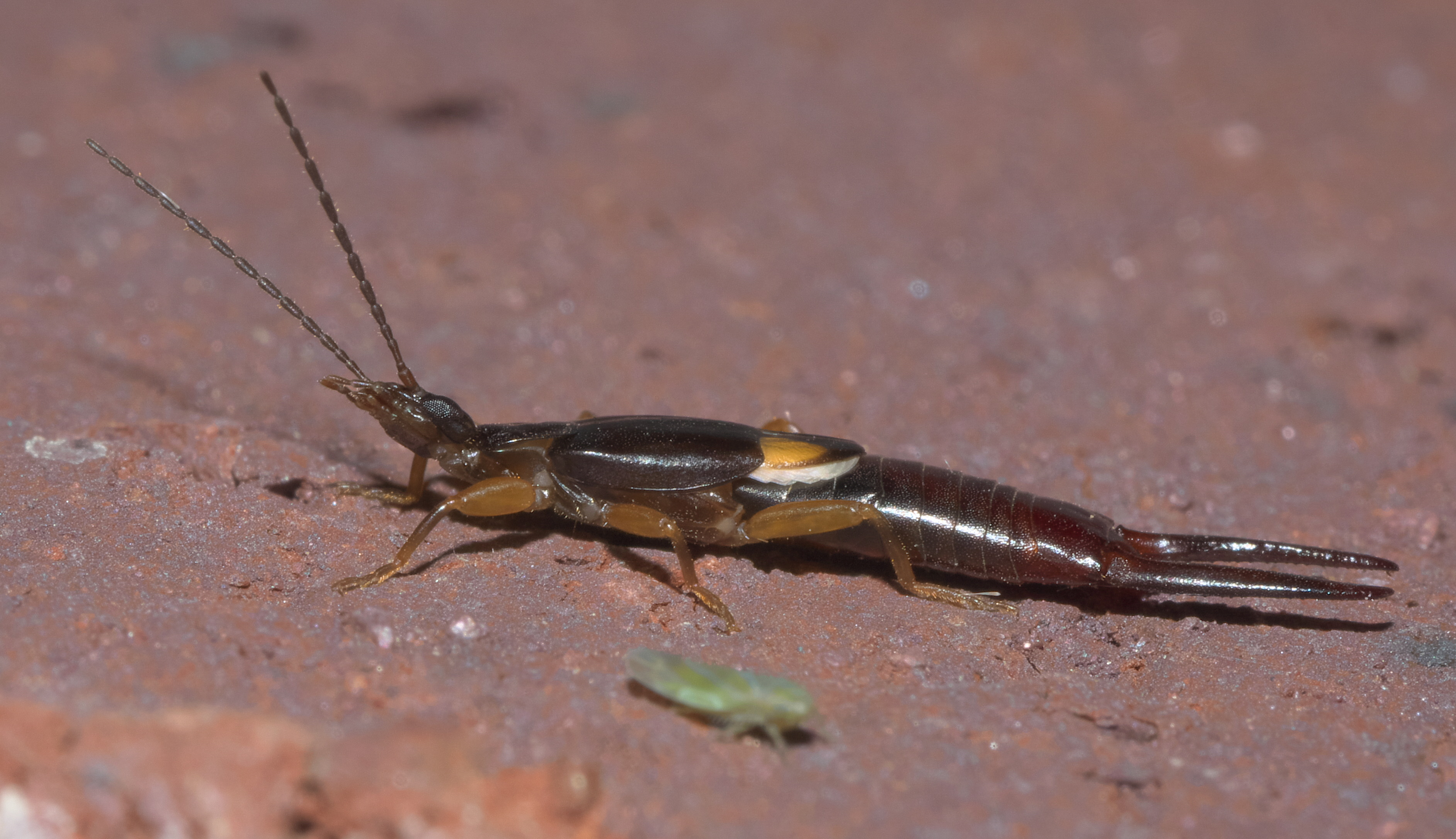
- Vostox brunneipennis

Scientific classification
- Domain: Eukaryota
- Kingdom: Animalia
- Phylum: Arthropoda
- Class: Insecta
- Order: Dermaptera
- Family: Spongiphoridae
- Subfamily: Spongiphorinae
- Genus: Vostox; Burr, 1911

= Vostox =

Genus of earwigs

Vostox is a genus of earwigs in the family Spongiphoridae, found in the Americas. There are more than 20 described species in Vostox.

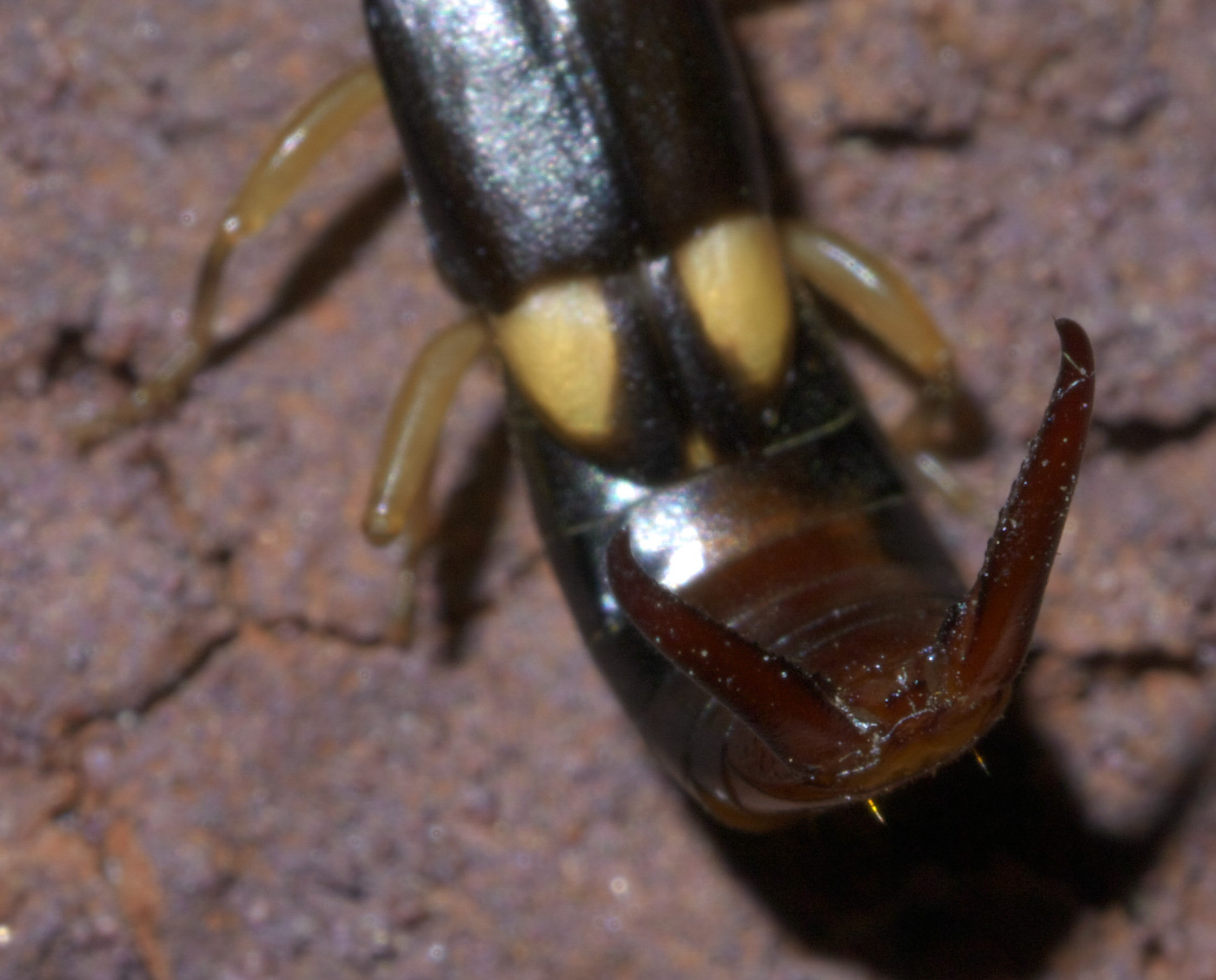
Vostox brunneipennis

== Species ==
These 24 species belong to the genus Vostox:

- Vostox americanus Steinmann, 1975
- Vostox apicedentatus (Caudell, 1904) (toothed earwig)
- Vostox asemus (Hebard, 1921)
- Vostox basalis (Burr, 1912)
- Vostox bertonii (Borelli, 1905)
- Vostox binotatus (Kirby, 1891)
- Vostox bolivianus Brindle, 1971
- Vostox brasilianus Steinmann, 1975
- Vostox brunneipennis (Audinet-Serville, 1838)
- Vostox cabrerae Rehn, 1925
- Vostox carinatus Brindle, 1977
- Vostox comitatus Steinmann, 1989
- Vostox confusus (Borelli, 1905)
- Vostox dentatus Brindle, 1988
- Vostox dubius (Moreira, 1931)
- Vostox dugueti Borelli, 1912
- Vostox ecuadorensis Steinmann, 1975
- Vostox excavatus Nutting & Gurney, 1961
- Vostox magnus Brindle, 1988
- Vostox ocellatus Brindle, 1971
- Vostox quadripunctatus Brindle, 1971
- Vostox recurrens (Burr, 1912)
- Vostox similis (de Bormans, 1883)
- Vostox vicinus (Burr, 1912)
