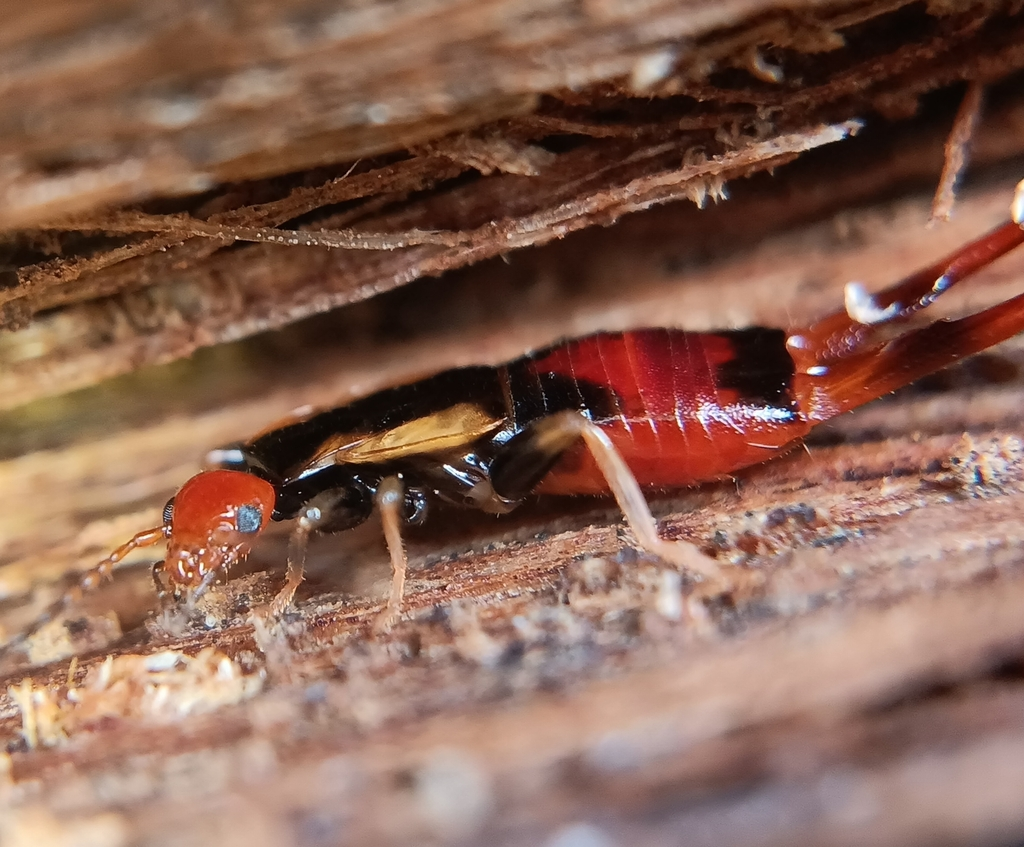
- Nesogaster aculeatus

Scientific classification
- Domain: Eukaryota
- Kingdom: Animalia
- Phylum: Arthropoda
- Class: Insecta
- Order: Dermaptera
- Family: Spongiphoridae
- Subfamily: Nesogastrinae
- Genus: Nesogaster; Verhoeff, 1902

= Nesogaster =

Genus of earwigs

Nesogaster is a genus of earwigs in the family Spongiphoridae. Its species are native to tropical areas, notably Asia and Australia.

Described species:

1. Nesogaster aculeatus (de Bormans, 1900)
2. Nesogaster aculeatus apoensis (Hincks, W. D., 1951)
3. Nesogaster amoenus (Stal, 1855)
4. Nesogaster bakeri (Hincks, 1947)
5. Nesogaster bidentatus (Srivastava, 1976)
6. Nesogaster burri (Rehn, 1946)
7. Nesogaster cristatus (Brindle, 1976)
8. Nesogaster dolichus (Burr, 1897)
9. Nesogaster dybasi (Srivastava, 1976)
10. Nesogaster gratiosus (Steinmann, 1990)
11. Nesogaster halli (Hincks, 1949)
12. Nesogaster intermedius (Borelli, 1932)
13. Nesogaster lewisi (de Bormans, 1903)
14. Nesogaster magnus (Steinmann, 1990)
15. Nesogaster milleri (Steinmann, 1990)
16. Nesogaster minusculus (Rehn, 1946)
17. Nesogaster mounseyi (Burr, 1914)
18. Nesogaster nigritus (Shiraki, 1905)
19. Nesogaster papuus (de Bormans, 1900)
20. Nesogaster rehni (Hincks, 1951)
21. Nesogaster ruficeps (Erichson, 1842)
22. Nesogaster spatulus (Brindle)
23. Nesogaster tristis (de Bormans, 1903)
24. Nesogaster wallacei (Burr, 1908)
