= Isolaboides =

Scientific classification
- Kingdom: Animalia
- Phylum: Arthropoda
- Class: Insecta
- Order: Dermaptera
- Family: Spongiphoridae
- Subfamily: Isolaboidinae
- Genus: Isolaboides; Hincks, 1958

Genus of earwigs

Isolaboides is a genus of south Asian earwigs in the family Spongiphoridae, erected by Walter Douglas Hincks in 1958.

== Species ==
The Dermaptera Species File includes:

1. Isolaboides burri (Borelli, 1909)
2. Isolaboides kosswigi (Hincks, 1947)
3. Isolaboides rimosus Steinmann, 1983
4. Isolaboides tuberculata Hincks, 1958
