= Irdex =

Scientific classification
- Domain: Eukaryota
- Kingdom: Animalia
- Phylum: Arthropoda
- Class: Insecta
- Order: Dermaptera
- Family: Spongiphoridae
- Subfamily: Spongiphorinae
- Genus: Irdex; Burr, 1911

Synonyms
- Apovostox Hebard, 1927; Argusina Hebard, 1927

Genus of earwigs

Irdex is a genus of earwigs belonging to the subfamily Spongiphorinae.

The species of this genus are found in Australia and Asia.

== Species ==
BioLib includes:

1. Irdex bicuneatus Borelli, 1932
2. Irdex brevis Brindle, 1970
3. Irdex burri Srivastava, 1975
4. Irdex ceylonensis Srivastava, 1983
5. Irdex chapmani Brindle, 1980
6. Irdex chauhani Srivastava, 1975
7. Irdex dakshinkaliensis Kapoor, Malla & Shah, 1978
8. Irdex elongatus (Srivastava, 1978)
9. Irdex ernstmayri Günther, 1930
10. Irdex fortunatus Steinmann, 1985
11. Irdex gracilis (Borelli, 1932)
12. Irdex hilaris (Bormans, 1900)
13. Irdex litus (Hebard, 1927)
14. Irdex nitidipennis (De Bormans, 1894)
15. Irdex papuanus (Brindle, 1970)
16. Irdex pilosus Bey-Bienko, 1959
17. Irdex poggii Srivastava, 1978
18. Irdex pygidiata (Dubrony, 1879)
19. Irdex rammei (Günther, 1929)
20. Irdex serratus (Kapoor, 1967)
21. Irdex stella (de Bormans, 1900)
22. Irdex tantalus Steinmann, 1985
23. Irdex unicolor Steinmann, 1985
24. Irdex unimitabilis Steinmann, 1985
25. Irdex wittmeri Brindle, 1975
