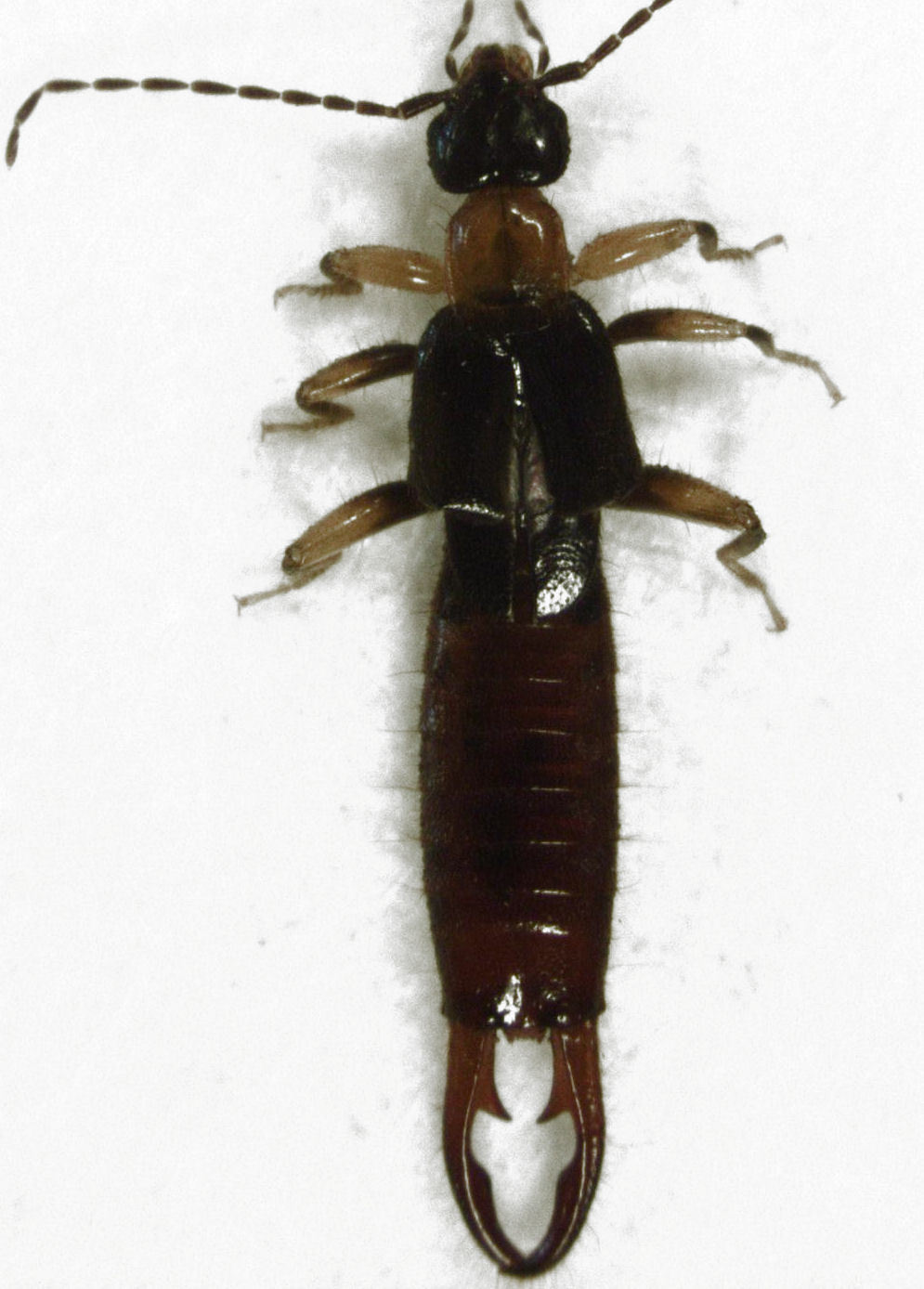
- Paraspania brunneri

Scientific classification
- Domain: Eukaryota
- Kingdom: Animalia
- Phylum: Arthropoda
- Class: Insecta
- Order: Dermaptera
- Family: Spongiphoridae
- Subfamily: Labiinae
- Genus: Paraspania; Steinmann, 1985

= Paraspania =

Genus of earwigs

Paraspania is a genus of earwigs in the family Spongiphoridae. Members of this genus are found distributed in south-eastern Australia and New Zealand.

== Species ==
- Paraspania anamalaiensis (Srivastava, 1969)
- Paraspania australiana (Mjöberg, 1913)
- Paraspania brunneri (de Bormans, 1883)
- Paraspania discors Steinmann, 1985
- Paraspania inflecta Steinmann, 1985
- Paraspania pendleburyi (Borelli, 1932)
- Paraspania pygmaea (Mjöberg, 1924)
- Paraspania torpeo Steinmann, 1990
