= Purex (earwig) =

Scientific classification
- Kingdom: Animalia
- Phylum: Arthropoda
- Class: Insecta
- Order: Dermaptera
- Family: Spongiphoridae
- Subfamily: Spongiphorinae
- Genus: Purex; Purex, 1911

Genus of earwigs

Purex is a genus of earwigs in the family Spongiphoridae; most records are from the Americas, mostly South America. There are around 14 described species in Purex.

== Species ==
The Dermaptera Species File lists:

1. Purex brunneri (de Bormans, 1903)
2. Purex divergens (Burr, 1899)
3. Purex eminens Steinmann, 1989
4. Purex esquivelae Brindle, 1968
5. Purex formosus Hebard, 1920
6. Purex frontalis (Dohrn, 1864)
7. Purex parvicollis (Stål, 1860)
8. Purex propinquus (Burr, 1911)
9. Purex pulchellus Brindle, 1977
10. Purex remotus (Burr, 1899)
11. Purex sinuatus Brindle, 1971
12. Purex staudingeri Brindle, 1971
13. Purex surinamensis Brindle, 1971
14. Purex versicolor (de Bormans, 1883)
