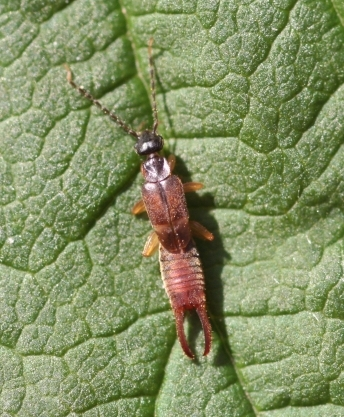

Scientific classification
- Kingdom: Animalia
- Phylum: Arthropoda
- Class: Insecta
- Order: Dermaptera
- Family: Spongiphoridae
- Genus: Labia
- Species: L. minor

Binomial name
- Labia minor (Linnaeus, 1758)

Synonyms
- Forficula minor Linnaeus, 1758; Forficula livida Gmelin, 1788; Forficula media Marsh, 1802; Labia minuta Scudder, 1862

= Labia minor =

Species of earwig

Labia minor, the lesser earwig or small earwig, is a species of earwig. It is widespread globally in temperate climates, preferring warm locations such as compost heaps in parts of its range. It is 4–7 mm long, including the pincer, and chocolate brown in color.

== Description ==
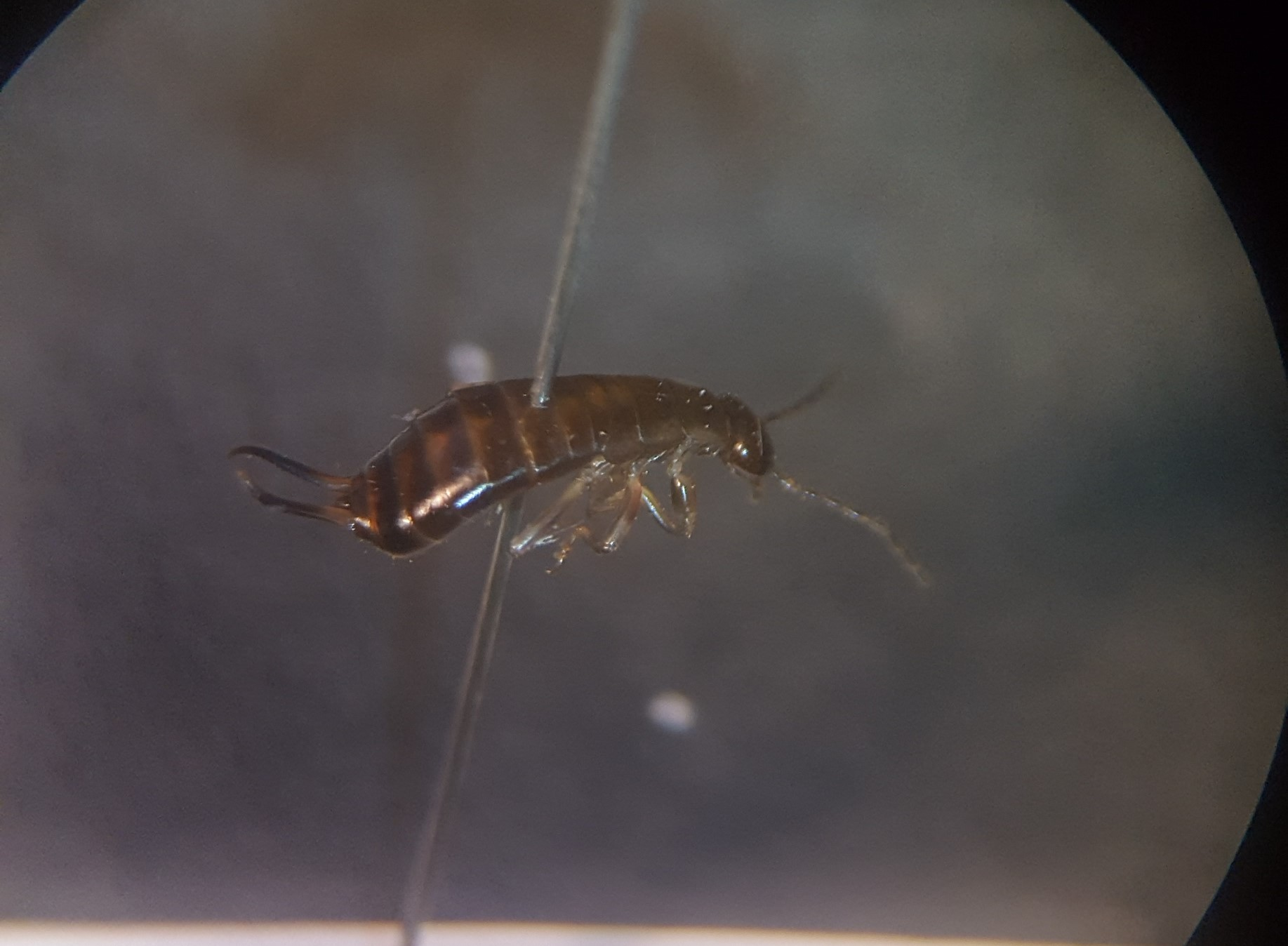
A larva of Labia Minor

Labia minor is about half the size of Forficula auricularia, at 4–7 millimetres (0.2–0.3 in) long. It is chocolate brown, and less shiny than the chestnut brown F. auricularia. The whole body is covered with fine yellow setae, and the antennae are a paler color. The forceps (pincer) at the animal's tail are used to help unfurl the wings, in preparation for flight. Unlike F. auricularia, Labia minor flies frequently.

== Ecology ==
Labia minor feeds on decaying plant material and other detritus. In cooler climates, it is only found in warm places, such as actively decaying compost heaps, and are most often encountered when turning the compost. Unusually for an insect, there is extensive maternal care of the eggs and offspring, with the mother feeding them for a week or two after they hatch.

== Distribution ==
Labia minor is widespread in temperate zones around the world. It is unclear whether it is a native species in North America, or an early adventive species. The first record from the United States dates from 1838, but the species may have been present for a long time before that. It ranges further north, into British Columbia and Quebec than any other earwig species, and is the only earwig in Quebec. It has also been introduced to Australia, Madeira, the Galápagos Islands and the Philippines. The species is probably often overlooked, however, due to its small size, and may be more widespread than is currently known.

== Taxonomic history ==
Labia minor was originally named by Carl Linnaeus in the 10th edition of his work Systema Naturae in 1758, under the name Forficula minor. When William Elford Leach established the genus Labia in 1815, Linnaeus' Forficula minor was made the type species of that new genus, and renamed Labia minor.
