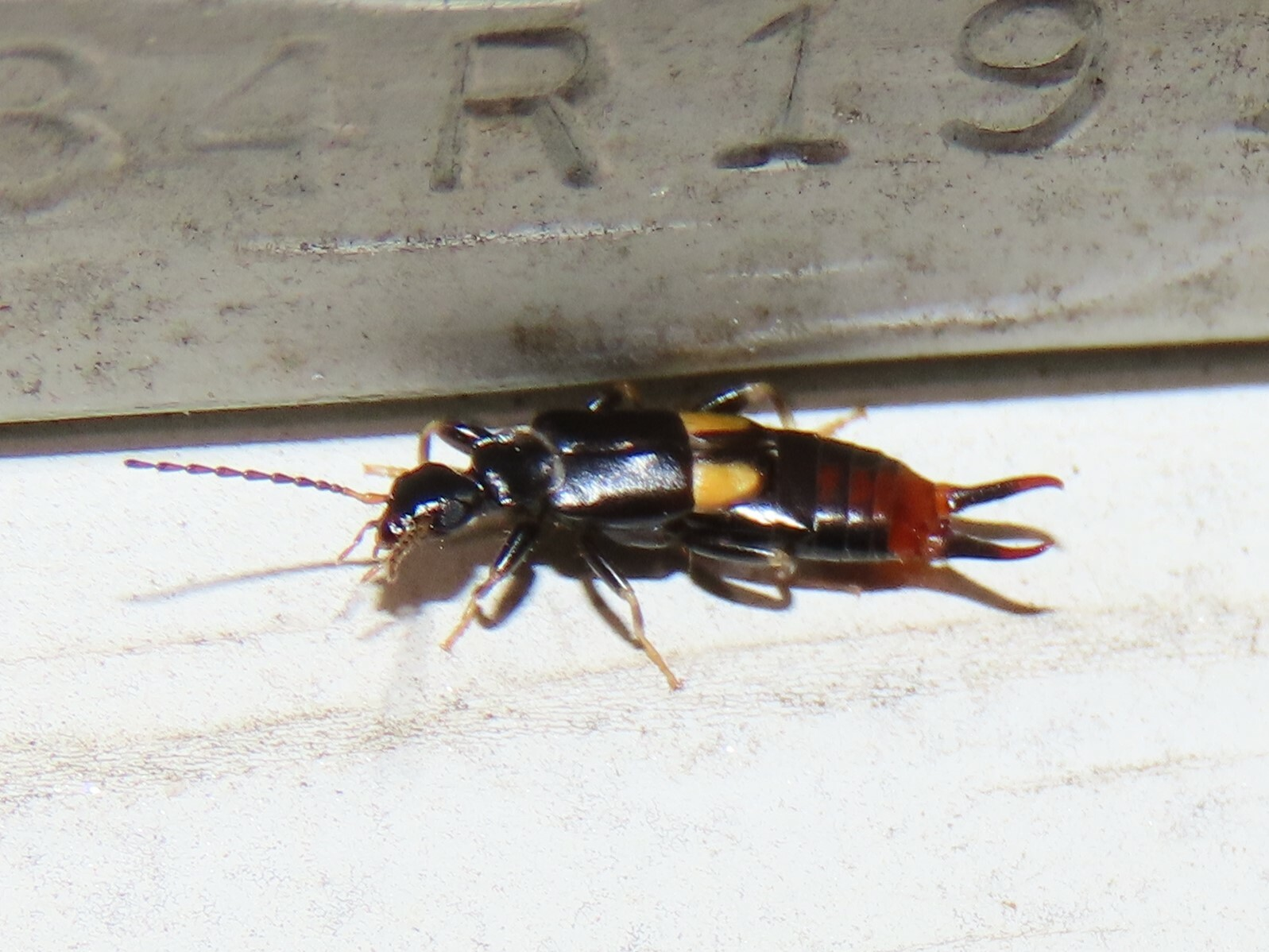
- Marava arachidis

Scientific classification
- Domain: Eukaryota
- Kingdom: Animalia
- Phylum: Arthropoda
- Class: Insecta
- Order: Dermaptera
- Family: Spongiphoridae
- Subfamily: Spongiphorinae
- Genus: Marava; Burr, 1911

Synonyms
- Larex Burr, 1911; Prolabia Burr, 1911

= Marava =

Genus of earwigs

Marava is a genus of earwigs in the family Spongiphoridae; most records are from the Americas, but M. arachidis is cosmopolitan (it has been recorded from the British Isles). There are more than 50 described species in Marava.

== Species ==
The Dermaptera Species File lists:

1. Marava alluaudi (Burr, 1904)
2. Marava arachidis (Yersin, 1860)
3. Marava bidentata Brindle, 1971
4. Marava brasiliana Brindle, 1971
5. Marava calverti (Rehn, 1921)
6. Marava championi (de Bormans, 1893)
7. Marava chapmani Steinmann, 1979
8. Marava dominicae (Rehn & Hebard, 1917)
9. Marava draco Steinmann, 1985
10. Marava elegantula Brindle, 1973
11. Marava emarginata Brindle, 1977
12. Marava equatoria (Burr, 1899)
13. Marava feae (Dubrony, 1879)
14. Marava flaviscuta (Rehn, 1903)
15. Marava flavohumeralis Brindle, 1988
16. Marava fulgida Brindle, 1970
17. Marava furia Steinmann, 1989
18. Marava grata Steinmann, 1985
19. Marava grenadensis Brindle, 1971
20. Marava griveaudi Brindle, 1966
21. Marava hildebrandti (Burr, 1912)
22. Marava jamaicana (Rehn & Hebard, 1917)
23. Marava lucida (Brindle, 1968)
24. Marava luzonica (Dohrn, 1864)
25. Marava machupicchuensis Brindle, 1971
26. Marava mexicana (de Bormans, 1883)
27. Marava modesta (Brunner, 1906)
28. Marava moreirai (Menozzi, 1932)
29. Marava †neli Engel, 2019
30. Marava nigrella (Dubrony, 1879)
31. Marava nigrocincta Brindle, 1988
32. Marava nitida (Burr, 1904)
33. Marava pallida Brindle, 1988
34. Marava paradoxa (Burr, 1904)
35. Marava paraguayensis (Caudell, 1904)
36. Marava parva (Burr, 1912)
37. Marava parvula Brindle, 1988
38. Marava pulchella (Audinet-Serville, 1838)
39. Marava pygidiata Brindle, 1988
40. Marava pyxis Steinmann, 1985
41. Marava quadrata Brindle, 1971
42. Marava rogersi (de Bormans, 1893)
43. Marava rotundata (Scudder, 1876)
44. Marava severini (Burr, 1900)
45. Marava silvestrii (Borelli, 1905)
46. Marava splendida Steinmann, 1985
47. Marava surinamensis (Brindle, 1968)
48. Marava townesi Brindle, 1979
49. Marava tricolor (Kirby, 1891)
50. Marava triquetra (Hebard, 1917)
51. Marava unidentata (Palisot de Beauvois, 1805)
52. Marava venezuelica Brindle, 1977
