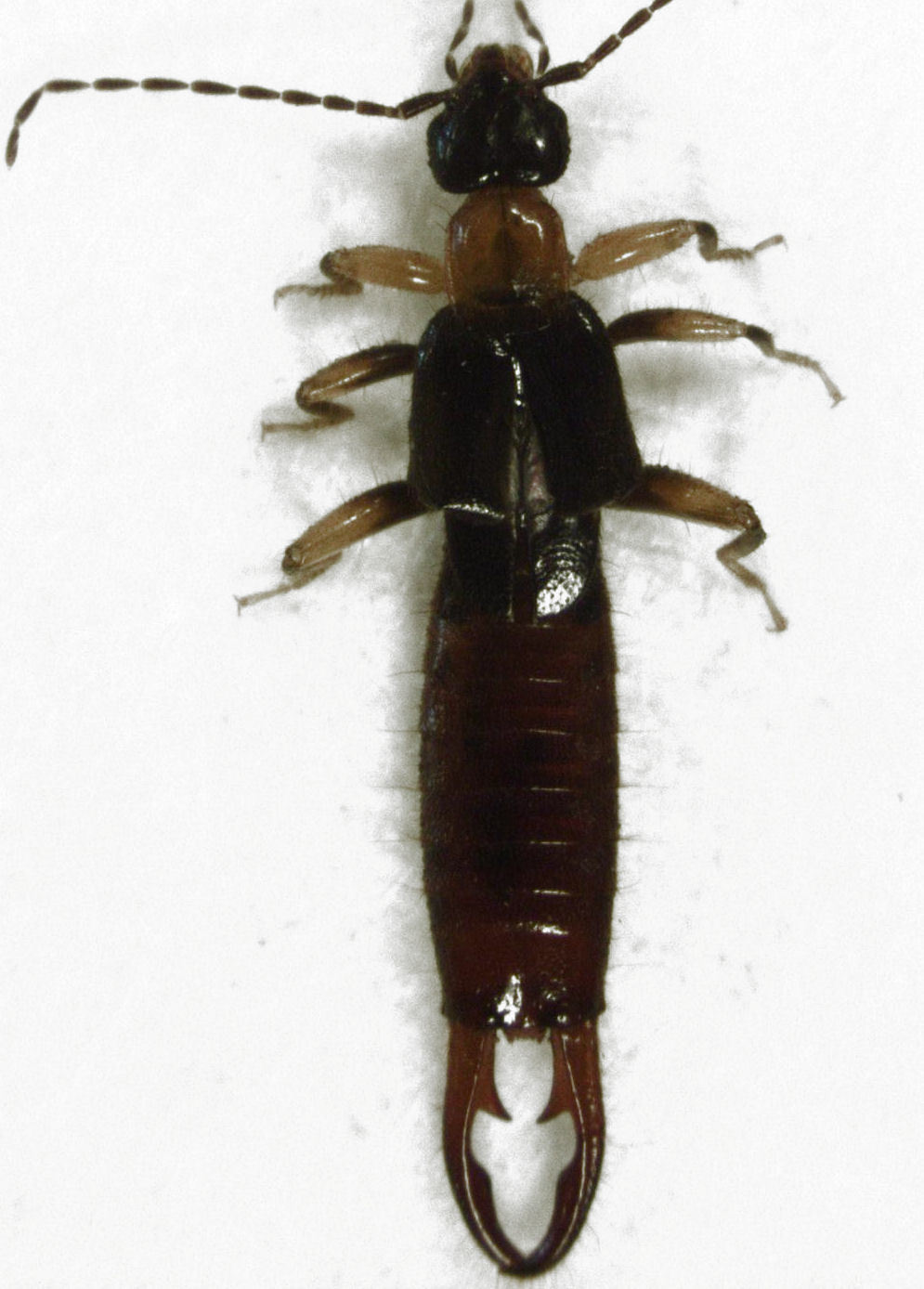
- Paraspania brunneri

Scientific classification
- Domain: Eukaryota
- Kingdom: Animalia
- Phylum: Arthropoda
- Class: Insecta
- Order: Dermaptera
- Suborder: Neodermaptera
- Infraorder: Epidermaptera
- Superfamily: Forficuloidea
- Family: Spongiphoridae; Verhoeff, 1902

Subfamilies
- Caecolbaiinae Steinmann, 1989; Cosmogeracinae Brindle, 1982; Geracinae Brindle, 1971; Isolaboidinae Brindle, 1978; Isopyginae Hincks, 1951; Labiinae Burr, 1909; Nesogastrinae Verhoeff, 1902; Pericominae Burr, 1911; Ramamurthiinae Steinmann, 1975; Rudracinae Srivastava, 1995; Sparattinae Verhoeff, 1902; Spongiphorinae Verhoeff, 1902; Strongylopsalinae Burr, 1911; Vandicinae Burr, 1911

= Spongiphoridae =

Spongiphoridae Temporal range: Albian–Recent

Family of earwigs

Spongiphoridae is a family of earwigs in the suborder Neodermaptera. There are more than 40 genera and 510 described species in Spongiphoridae.

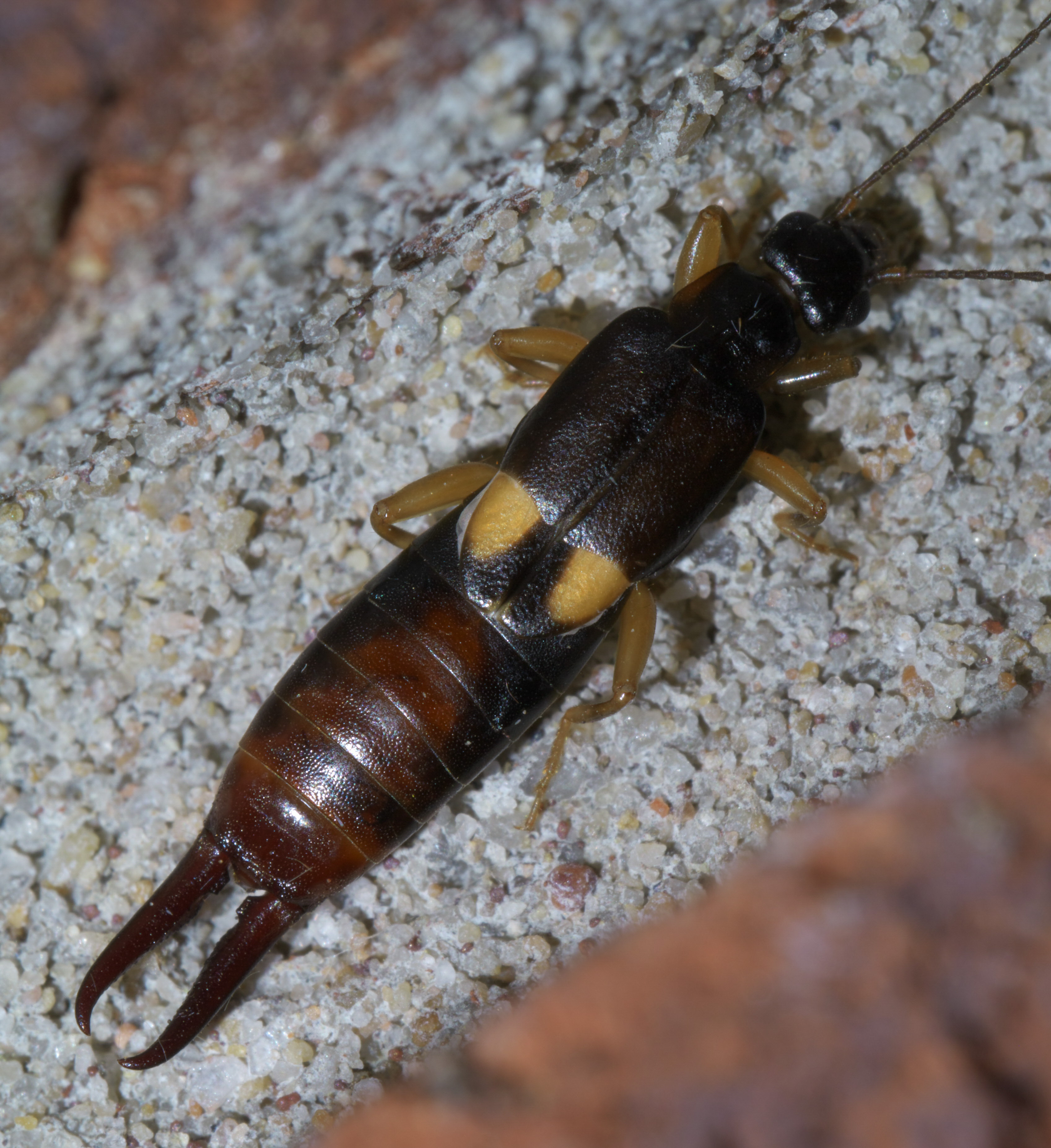
Vostox brunneipennis P1650758a

== Genera ==
These 43 genera belong to the family Spongiphoridae:

- Auchenomus Karsch, 1886
- Barygerax Hebard, 1917
- Caecolabia Brindle, 1975
- Chaetolabia Brindle, 1972
- Chaetospania Karsch, 1886
- Circolabia Steinmann, 1987
- Cosmogerax Hebard, 1933
- Eugerax Hebard, 1917
- Filolabia Steinmann, 1989
- Formicilabia Rehn & Hebard, 1917
- Gerax Hebard, 1917
- Homotages Burr, 1909
- Irdex Burr, 1911
- Isolabella Verhoeff, 1902
- Isolaboides Hincks, 1958
- Isopyge Borelli, 1931
- Labia Leach, 1815
- Marava Burr, 1911
- Mecomera Audinet-Serville, 1838
- Nesogaster Verhoeff, 1902
- Nesolabia Hincks, 1957
- Paralabella Steinmann, 1990
- Paralaboides Steinmann, 1989
- Parapericomus Ramamurthi, 1967
- Paraspania Steinmann, 1985
- Paratages Srivastava, 1987
- Pericomus Burr, 1911
- Pseudomarava Steinmann, 1989
- Pseudovostox Borelli, 1926
- Purex Burr, 1911
- Ramamurthia Steinmann, 1975
- Rudrax Srivastava, 1995
- Sparatta Audinet-Serville, 1838
- Sphingolabis de Bormans, 1883
- Spirolabia Steinmann, 1987
- Spongiphora Audinet-Serville, 1831
- Spongovostox Burr, 1911
- Strongylolabis Steinmann, 1986
- Strongylopsalis Burr, 1900
- Vandex Burr, 1911
- Vostox Burr, 1911
- Yepezia Brindle, 1982
- † Sinolabia Zhou & Chen, 1983 Qujiang Group, China, Albian
