= Euborellia brunneri =

Scientific classification
- Domain: Eukaryota
- Kingdom: Animalia
- Phylum: Arthropoda
- Class: Insecta
- Order: Dermaptera
- Family: Anisolabididae
- Genus: Euborellia
- Species: E. brunneri

Binomial name
- Euborellia brunneri (Dohrn, 1864)

Synonyms
- Forcinella brunneri Dohrn, 1864; Gonolabis verhoeffi Burr, 1905; Anisolabis verhoeffi (Burr, 1905)

Species of earwig

Euborellia brunneri is a species of earwig in the family Anisolabididae.

== Taxonomy ==
This species was originally described by Heinrich Wolfgang Ludwig Dohrn, as Forcinella brunneri, in 1864 from a female specimen collected by Brunner in Adelaide, Australia. In 1905 a male specimen, also from South Australia, was mistakenly thought to be a new species and was named by Malcolm Burr as the synonym Gonolabis verhoeffi (and soon after known as Anisolabis verhoeffi). The species is now placed in the genus Euborellia, and is thus named Euborellia brunneri.

== Description ==
Euborellia brunneri is apterous and sexually dimorphic in terms of size. It is native to coastal regions of eastern Australia; specifically, it occurs in the states of Victoria, Tasmania, South Australia, New South Wales, and Queensland. E. brunneri tends to keep hidden beneath plant detritus and other debris where it is dark and damp. Individuals are mostly nocturnal and solitary, but may occur in abundance when habitat conditions are suitable.

The behavioural ecology of E. brunneri was the subject of research that resulted in several scientific publications, primarily authored by Emile van Lieshout and Mark Adrian Elgar.

== See also ==
- List of Dermapterans of Australia

An additional two species of the genus Euborellia are known from Australia:

- The ringlegged earwig (Euborellia annulipes)
- Euborellia jeekeli
