= List of Dermapterans of Australia =

The following list provides the earwigs currently identified from Australia.

== Family Anisolabididae ==
- Anisolabis australis Tindale, 1923
- Anisolabis dohrni (Kirby, 1891)
- Anisolabis flavocapitata Steinmann, 1979
- Anisolabis littorea (White, 1846)
- Anisolabis maritima (Bonelli, 1832) (cosmopolitan)
- Anisolabis nigrofusca Steinmann, 1979
- Anisolabis pacifica (Erichson, 1842)
- Anisolabis subarmata (Kirby, 1900)
- Anisolabis westralica Burr, 1911
- Antisolabis gisleni (Hincks, 1954)
- Antisolabis holdhausi (Burr, 1910)
- Antisolabis notonoma Hincks, 1952
- Carcinophora occidentalis (Kirby, 1896)
- Carcinophora venusta Steinmann, 1989
- Euborellia annulipes (Lucas, 1847)
- Euborellia brunneri (Dohrn, 1864)
- Euborellia jeekeli Srivastava, 1985
- Gonolabis dentata Steinmann, 1981
- Gonolabis electa Burr, 1910
- Gonolabis forcipata Burr, 1908
- Gonolabis gilesi Steinmann, 1981
- Gonolabis rossi Brindle, 1987
- Gonolabis tasmanica (Bormans, 1880)
- Gonolabis woodwardi Burr, 1908
- Isolabis cavagnaroi Brindle, 1987
- Metisolabis punctata (Dubrony, 1879)
- Parisopsalis spryi Burr, 1914
- Titanolabis bormansi Srivastava, 1983
- Titanolabis centaurea Steinmann, 1985
- Titanolabis colossea (Dohrn, 1864)
- Titanolabis gigas Steinmann, 1989
- Zacheria dentata (Burr, 1908)

== Family Apachyidae ==
- Apachyus athertonensis Mjöberg, 1924
- Apachyus beccarii Dubrony, 1879
- Apachyus peterseni Borelli, 1925
- Apachyus queenslandicus Mjöberg, 1924

== Family Chelisochidae ==
- Chelisoches ater Bormans, 1900
- Chelisoches australicus (Le Guillou, 1841)
- Chelisoches handschini Günther, 1934
- Chelisoches kimberleyensis Mjöberg, 1913
- Chelisoches morio (Fabricius, 1775)
- Hamaxas feae (Bormans, 1894)
- Hamaxas nigrorufus (Burr, 1902)
- Lamprophorella kervillei (Burr, 1905)
- Proreus duruoides Hebard, 1933

== Family Forficulidae ==
- Doru spiculiferum (Kirby, 1891)
- Elaunon bipartitus (Kirby, 1891)
- Eparchus insignis (De Haan, 1842)
- Forficula dentata, part of Forficula auricularia complex of species Linnaeus, 1758 (introduced)
- Forficula vilmi Steinmann, 1989
- Obelura venus (Steinmann, 1993), previously known as Syntonus venus Steinmann, 1993

== Family Labiduridae ==
- Gonolabidura meteor Steinmann, 1985
- Labidura truncata Kirby, 1903
- Nala lividipes (Dufour, 1820)

== Family Pygidicranidae ==
- Austroblandex bituberculatus Brindle, 1987
- Brindlensia jeekeli Srivastava, 1985
- Cranopygia daemeli (Dohrn, 1869)
- Cranopygia lueddemanni Srivastava, 1984
- Cranopygia ophthalmica (Dohrn, 1863)
- Dacnodes hackeri (Burr, 1914)
- Dacnodes shortridgei (Burr, 1914)
- Echinosoma sumatranum (de Haan, 1842)
- Echinosoma yorkense Dohrn, 1869

== Family Spongiphoridae ==
- Auchenomus bifurcus Steinmann, 1984
- Chaetospania australica (Bormans, 1883)
- Chaetospania mjobergi Brindle, 1971
- Irdex hilaris (Bormans, 1900)
- Irdex unicolor Steinmann, 1985
- Labia minor (Linnaeus, 1758) (cosmopolitan)
- Marava arachidis (Yersin, 1860)
- Marava feae (Dubrony, 1879)
- Marava luzonica (Dohrn, 1864)
- Marava tricolor (Kirby, 1891)
- Nesogaster amoena (Stål, 1855)
- Nesogaster halli Hincks, 1949
- Nesogaster rehni Hincks, 1951
- Nesogaster ruficeps (Erichson, 1842)
- Paralabella curvicauda (Motschulsky, 1863)
- Paralabella murrayi (Kirby, 1900)
- Paraspania australiana (Mjöberg, 1913)
- Paraspania brunneri (Bormans, 1883)
- Paraspania discors Steinmann, 1985
- Paraspania pygmaea (Mjöberg, 1924)
- Paraspania torpeo Steinmann, 1990
- Spirolabia pilicornis (Motschulsky, 1863)
- Spongovostox doddi (Burr, 1914)
- Spongovostox hackeri (Burr, 1914)
- Spongovostox nigroflavidus (Rehn, 1905)
- Spongovostox subapterus (Kirby, 1891)
- Spongovostox victoriae (Burr, 1914)

== See also ==
- List of Dermapterans of Sri Lanka
