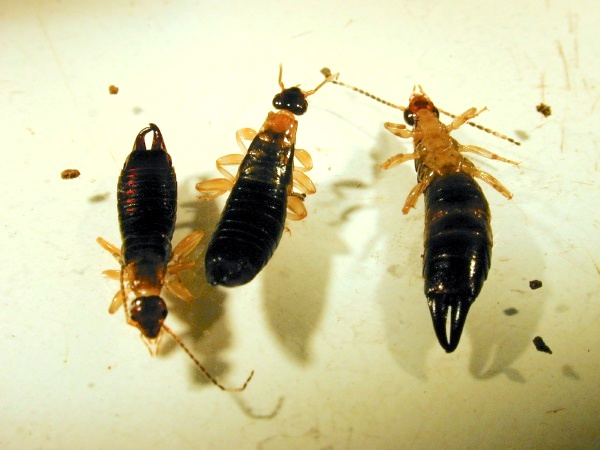
- Euborellia sp.

Scientific classification
- Domain: Eukaryota
- Kingdom: Animalia
- Phylum: Arthropoda
- Class: Insecta
- Order: Dermaptera
- Family: Anisolabididae
- Subfamily: Anisolabidinae
- Genus: Euborellia; Burr, 1910

Species
- See text

Synonyms
- Borellia Burr, 1909; Heterolabis Borelli, 1912

= Euborellia =

Genus of earwigs

Euborellia is a genus of earwigs in the subfamily Anisolabidinae. This genus, which has a world-wide distribution, was erected by Malcolm Burr in 1909 and was cited by Srivastava in Part 2 of Fauna of India.

== Species ==
Species of these, relatively small, dark-coloured earwigs can be difficult to distinguish from one another. The Dermaptera Species File lists:

1. Euborellia abbreviata Srivastava, 1977
2. Euborellia andreinii (Borelli, 1908)
3. Euborellia angustata Kočárek, 2011
4. Euborellia annandalei (Burr, 1906)
5. Euborellia annulipes (Lucas, 1847)
6. Euborellia aporonoma (Borelli, 1909)
7. Euborellia arcanum Matzke & Kočárek, 2015
8. Euborellia armata (Borelli, 1906)
9. Euborellia boliviana Brindle, 1971
10. Euborellia brasiliensis (Borelli, 1912)
11. Euborellia brunneri (Dohrn, 1864)
12. Euborellia burmensis Srivastava, 1984
13. Euborellia caraibea Hebard, 1921
14. Euborellia cincticollis (Gerstaecker, 1883)
15. Euborellia compressa (Borelli, 1907)
16. Euborellia dattai Srivastava, 1977
17. Euborellia dimidiata Brindle, 1978
18. Euborellia eteronoma (Borelli, 1909)
19. Euborellia feae (Borelli, 1907)
20. Euborellia femoralis (Dohrn, 1863)
21. Euborellia flava Steinmann, 1981
22. Euborellia flavipes Moreira, 1931
23. Euborellia flavohumeralis Brindle, 1978
24. Euborellia fulviceps Borelli, 1921
25. Euborellia inermis Moreira, 1931
26. Euborellia insulana (Borelli, 1912)
27. Euborellia ituriensis Brindle, 1978
28. Euborellia janeirensis (Dohrn, 1864)
29. Euborellia jeekeli Srivastava, 1985
30. Euborellia lata Anisyutkin, 1998
31. Euborellia malgacha Brindle, 1966
32. Euborellia manipurensis Srivastava, 1975
33. Euborellia mexicana Brindle, 1971
34. Euborellia mindanoensis Srivastava, 1999
35. Euborellia moesta (Géné, 1837) - type species (as Forficula moesta Géné)
36. Euborellia mystica (Steinmann, 1979)
37. Euborellia nigropicea (Borelli, 1924)
38. Euborellia nitens (Brindle, 1978)
39. Euborellia nitida Moreira, 1932
40. Euborellia ornata Kočárek, 2011
41. Euborellia peregrina (Mjöberg, 1904)
42. Euborellia philippinensis Srivastava, 1979
43. Euborellia plebeja (Dohrn, 1863)
44. Euborellia punctata Borelli, 1927
45. Euborellia purpurea (Borelli, 1921)
46. Euborellia rajasthanensis Srivastava, 1977
47. Euborellia sakaii Steinmann, 1978
48. Euborellia sechuana (Bey-Bienko, 1934)
49. Euborellia silvestrii (Borelli, 1914)
50. Euborellia stali (Dohrn, 1864)
51. Euborellia tatei Hebard, 1924
52. Euborellia tellinii (Borelli, 1908)
53. Euborellia tropica Steinmann, 1989
54. Euborellia truncata Brindle, 1978
55. Euborellia ugandana Brindle, 1978
56. Euborellia uruguayensis Brindle, 1971
57. Euborellia vanderbildti Rehn, 1936
58. Euborellia vernicosa Anisyutkin, 1998

Note: not listed above:

1. Euborellia ambigua Borelli, 1905: probably synonym of Anisolabis ambigua Borelli, 1906?
2. Euborellia annulata Lucas = Euborellia annulipes (Lucas, 1847)?
3. Euborellia pallipes (Shiraki, 1905) synonym of Euborellia plebeja ?
