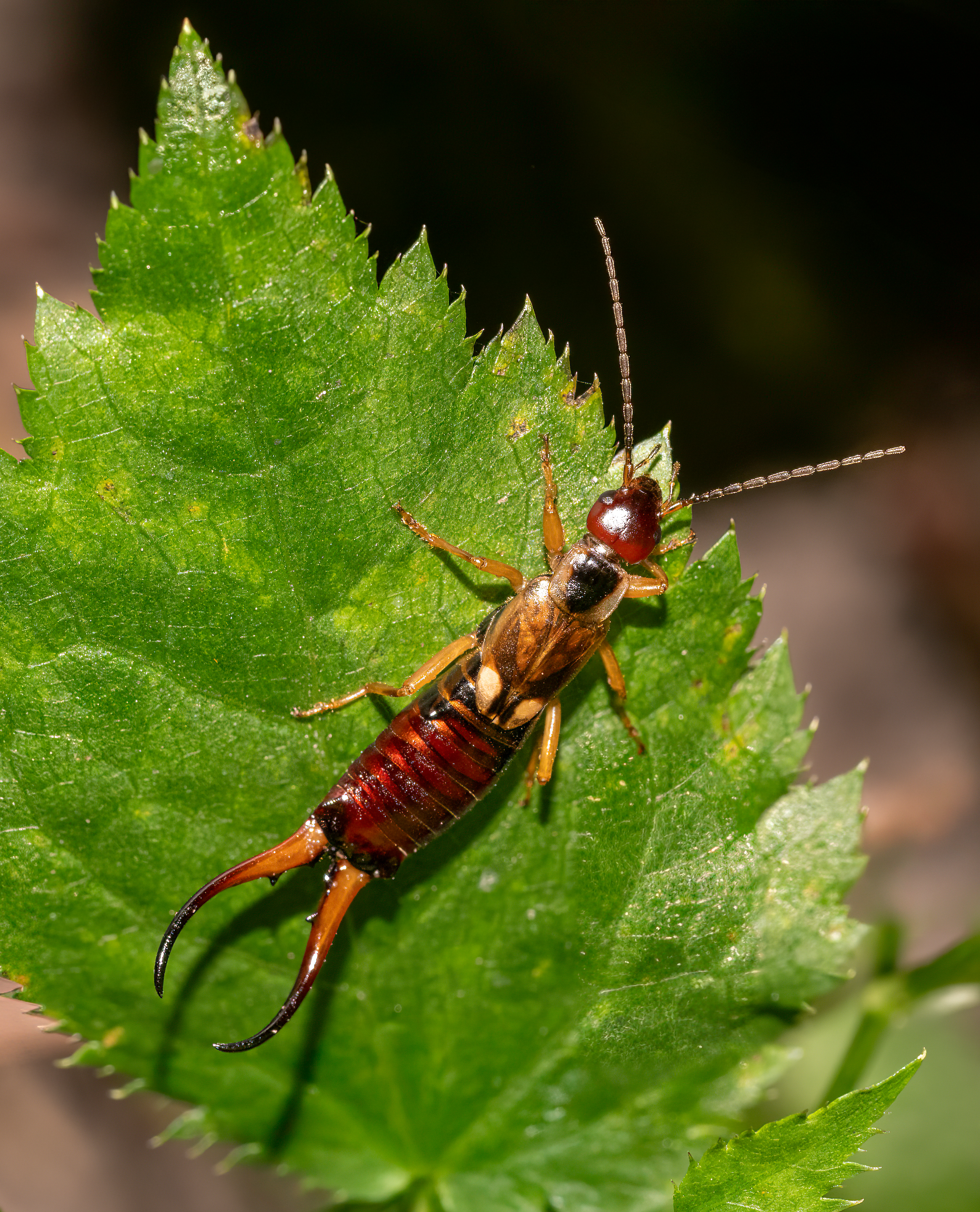
- Male in New York, USA
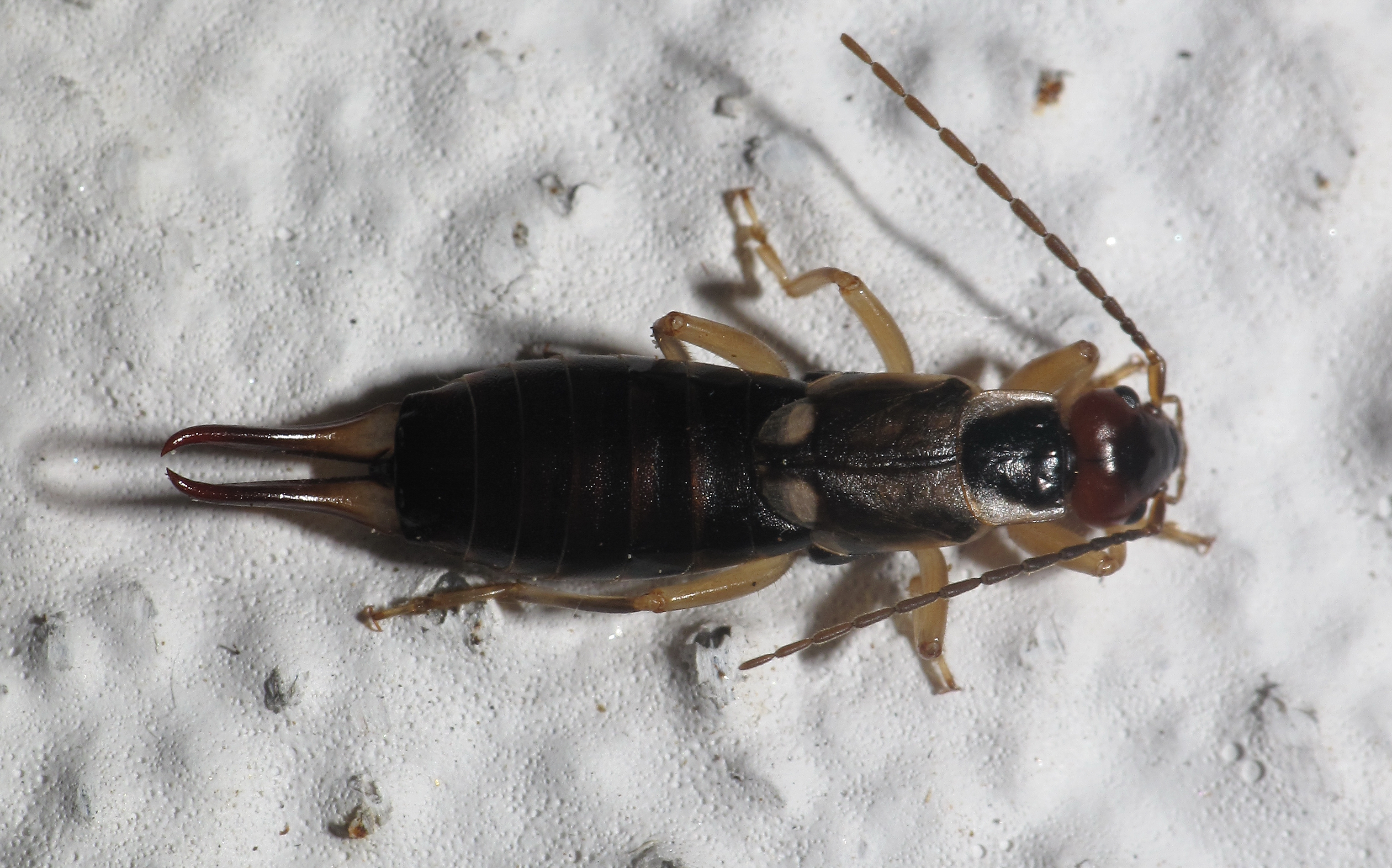
- Female in Brión, Spain

Scientific classification
- Kingdom: Animalia
- Phylum: Arthropoda
- Clade: Pancrustacea
- Class: Insecta
- Order: Dermaptera
- Family: Forficulidae
- Genus: Forficula
- Species: F. auricularia

Binomial name
- Forficula auricularia Linnaeus, 1758

= Forficula auricularia =

Species of earwig

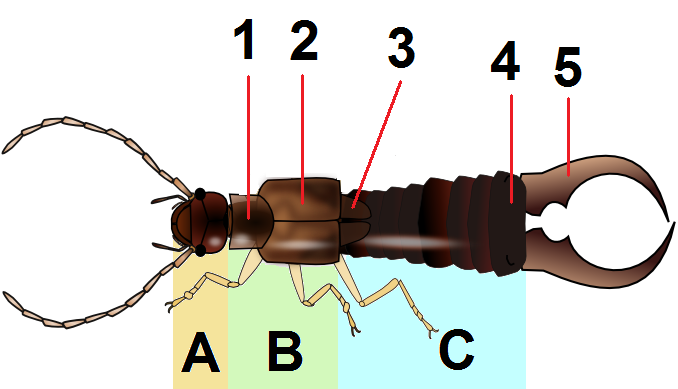

Forficula auricularia is a species complex comprising the common earwig. It is also known as the European earwig. It is an omnivorous insect belonging to the family Forficulidae. The name earwig comes from the appearance of the hindwings, which are unique in their resemblance to human ears when unfolded. The species name of the common earwig, auricularia, is a specific reference to this feature. The European earwig survives in a variety of environments. It is also a common household insect in North America. They are often considered a household pest because of their tendency to invade crevices in homes and consume pantry foods, though they may also act as beneficial species depending on the circumstances.

Forficula auricularia is reddish-brown in color with a flattened elongated body and slender beaded antennae. Earwigs possess pairs of pincers or forceps at the tip of the flexible abdomen. Both sexes have these pincers. In males, they are large and curved, whereas in females, they are straight. Nymphs are similar to adults in appearance, though their wings are either absent or small.

== Morphology ==
Forficula auricularia have elongated flattened brownish-colored bodies, with a shield-shaped pronotum, two pairs of wings, and a pair of forceps-like cerci. They are about 12–15 mm (0.47–0.59 in) long. The second tarsal segment, which is located on the leg, is lobed, extending distally below the third tarsal segment. The antenna consists of 11–14 segments, and the mouth parts are of the chewing type.

An anatomical diagram of the common earwig can be found to the right. Section A represents the head, B represents the thorax, and C represents the abdomen. The numbers correspond to different body parts. 1 is pointing to the pronotum (a plate-like structure that covers the thorax), and 2 is pointing to the elytra (tough outer wings used to protect the more delicate hind wings). 3 is pointing to the delicate hind wings peeking out, and 4 is pointing to the abdomen. 5 is pointing to the cerci (paired appendages on the abdomen of many insects).

== Taxonomy ==
A detailed analysis of mitochondrial DNA from specimens across Europe has established that Forficula auricularia is a complex of several morphologically indistinguishable species. There are at least four species in the Forficula auricularia complex: Forficula auricularia, Forficula dentata, Forficula mediterranea, and Forficula aeolica.

The name Forficula auricularia applies to those found in Scandinavia and Central Europe, whereas Forficula dentata is the usual species found in the British Isles and Western Europe. There are several other members of the complex distinguished based on mitochondrial haplotypes.

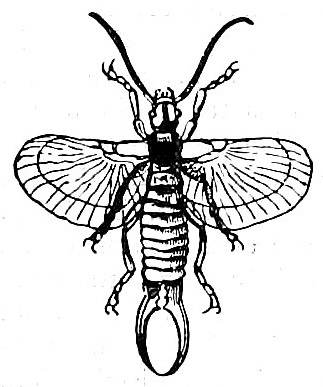
Illustration of male common earwig with wings extended

In North America, European earwigs were found to comprise two sibling species, which are reproductively isolated. Populations in cold continental climates mostly have one clutch per year, forming Forficula auricularia whereas those in warmer climates have two clutches per year, forming Forficula dentata.

== Distribution ==
Originating in Europe, western Asia and possibly North Africa, Forficula auricularia was introduced to North America in the early twentieth century and has since spread throughout much of the continent. It was accidentally introduced into New Zealand by Early European settlers. European earwigs are most commonly found in temperate climates, since they were originally discovered in the Palearctic region, and are most active when the daily temperature has minimal fluctuation.

== Habitat ==
Thriving in cool, moist habitats, European earwigs exhibit optimal growth at a mean temperature of 24 °C (75 °F). Their daily abundance in a given year has been linked to factors such as temperature, wind velocity, and the prevalence of easterly winds. The development of European earwigs also depends on temperature. The occurrence of European earwigs can be predicted based on weather parameters. Hibernating adults can tolerate cool temperatures, but their survival is reduced in poorly drained soils such as clay. To avoid excessive moisture, they seek the southern side of well-drained slopes. Sometimes they also occupy the hollow stems of flowers where the soil is poorly drained. Their eggs are capable of resisting damage from cold and heat.

== Behavior ==
European earwigs spend the daytime in cool, dark, inaccessible places, such as flowers, fruits, and wood crevices. They are primarily active at night, seeking out food ranging from plant matter to small insects. Though they are omnivorous, they are considered as scavengers rather than predators. Often they consume plant matter, though they have also been known to feed on aphids, spiders, insect eggs, and dead plants and insects, among other things. Their favorite plants include the common crucifer Sisymbrium officinale, the white clover Trifolium repens, and the dahlia Dahlia variabilis. They also like to feed on molasses, as well as on nonvascular plants, lichens and algae. They prefer meat or sugar to natural plant material even though plants are a major natural food source. European earwigs prefer aphids to plant material such as leaves and fruit slices of apple, cherry and pear. Adults eat more insects than do nymphs.

Although Forficula auricularia have well-developed wings, they are fairly weak and are rarely, if ever, used. Instead, as their main form of transportation, earwigs are carried from one place to another on clothing or commercial products like lumber, ornamental shrubs and even newspaper bundles.

== Reproduction ==
=== Courtship ===
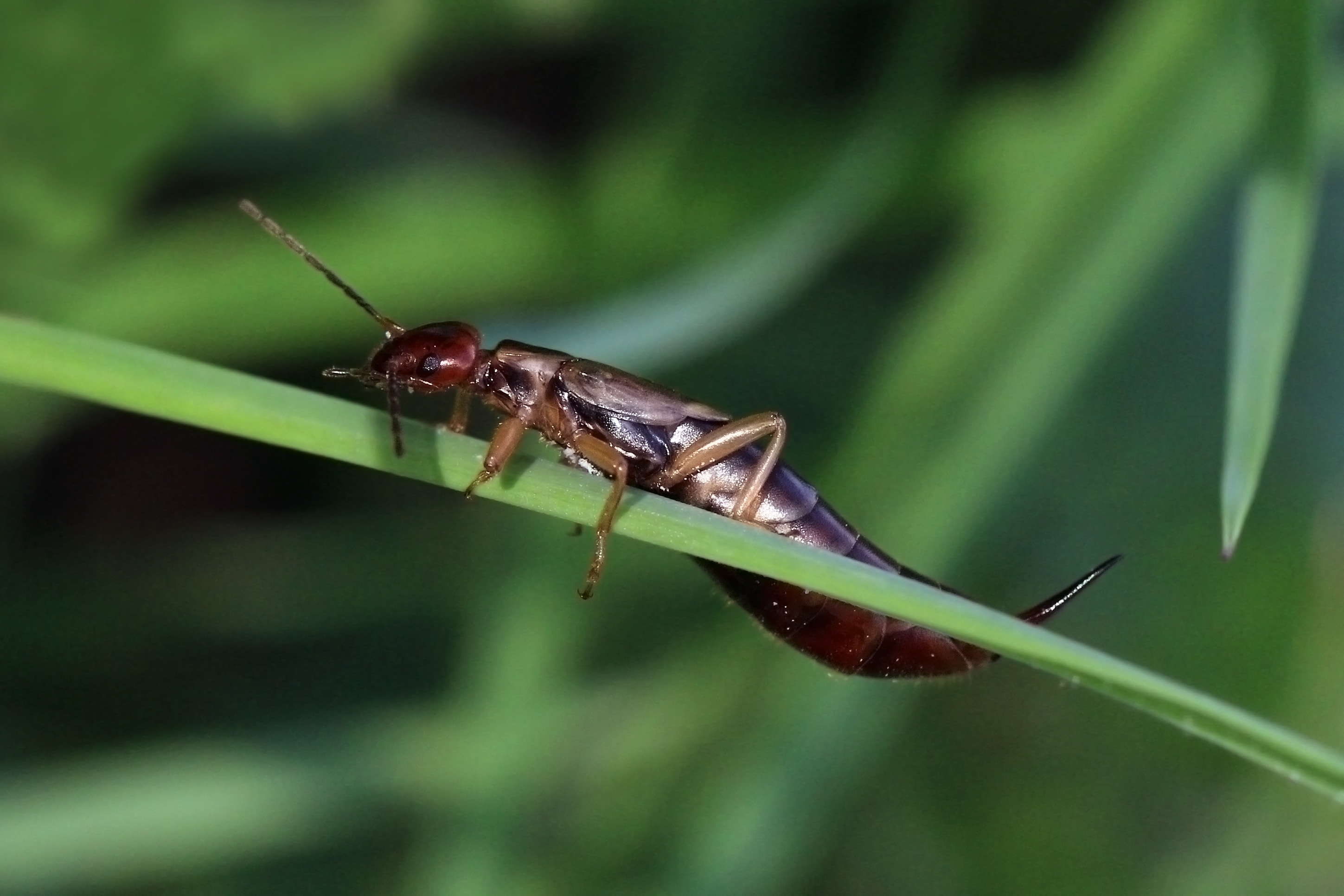
Female

Courtship in European common earwigs is unique in the sense that both males and females take active roles in courtship. Unlike most earwig species, detailed observations of the courtship and mating processes in Forficula auricularia reveal complex sexual behaviors for both the males and females. The European earwig possesses sexually dimorphic cerci (forceps). Adult males are polymorphic in body weight and head width, as well as cercus length and width. The males have large, heavy, curved forceps that are very robust and broadened basally with crenulate teeth. Females have straight and slender forceps that are 3 mm long, and are less robust and straighter. Studies have demonstrated the significance of these cerci for use as displays in early courtship and as a tactile stimulus for the female during copulation, as well as feeding and self-defense purposes.

Early courtship typically consists of male displays in which they wave or bob the cerci. The common earwigs do not have a sex pheromone because they already have an aggregation pheromone which already brings the male and female insects into close proximity with one another.

Courtship will then progress to tactile stimulation by the males and sometimes females, if they are receptive. The males tend to use their cerci to stroke and encircle the female's body. Both sexes participate in waving, bobbing, and stroking movements, but only males use their forceps to encircle the female. It is interesting to note that the cerci seem to be strictly used for courtship/stimulation and defense against any potential threats; the males do not ever use the forceps aggressively as claspers to hold the female in place during copulation.

The cerci stimulation is followed by abdomen arching, bobbing, and twisting before copulation occurs. Research suggests that male cerci are necessary for reproductive success because of their role as either secondary sexual characteristics for courtship or as weapons in altercations; males with their cerci removed were unable to successfully find a mate.

=== Copulation ===
A male finds prospective mates by olfaction. After a complex courtship performance by both the male and female, the male slips his cerci under the tip of the female's abdomen so that his and her ventral abdominal surfaces are in contact with each other, while both face in opposite directions. If not disturbed, pairs can stay in this mating position for many hours. During copulation, the females often move around and feed. Because they provide brood care, female Forficula auricularia have intensive nutritional requirements which likely motivates their activity during copulation—especially because female European earwigs rarely ever feed during oviposition (laying of the eggs), incubation, and brood care. Matings occurred frequently among clustered individuals particularly in locations that allow both partners to cling to a surface. Under laboratory conditions, the mating season peaked during August and September, and a single mating event enabled females to lay fertilized eggs.

== Maternal care ==
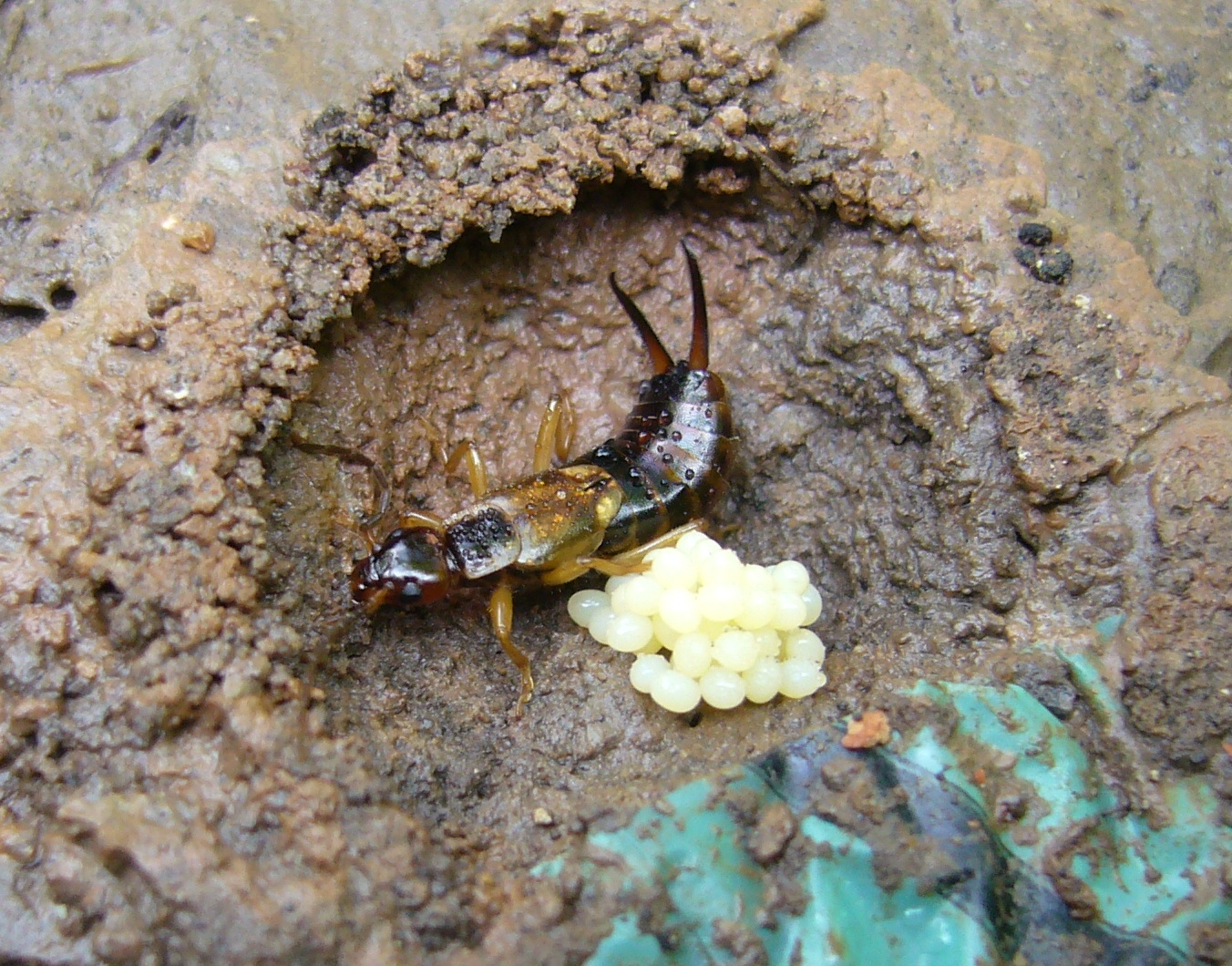
Female with nest

European earwig nymphs look very similar to their adult counterparts except that they are a lighter color. The young go through four nymphal stages and do not leave the nest until after the first moult.

European earwigs overwinter about 5 mm (0.2 in) below the surface of the ground. The female earwig lays a clutch of about 50 eggs in an underground nest in the autumn. She enters a dormant state and stays in the nest with the eggs.

Common earwigs exhibit varying levels of maternal care. Female earwigs typically show maternal care through behaviors such as guarding and tending to their eggs and nymphs. The female cares for her young by shifting the eggs about and continuously cleaning them with her mouth and forceps to avoid fungal growth and pathogens through careful extraction of fungal spores from the eggs. She protects the eggs by staying close to the nest, fiercely defending against predators, applying chemical protection against desiccation through egg grooming, and relocating the entire clutch under stressful conditions. Their protection of the eggs involves remaining close to the nest and defending against potential predators.

In the spring, she spreads them out into a single layer and the young emerge from the eggs. After the eggs hatch in the spring, the mother continues to care for the nymphs, providing protection, grooming, food, and sometimes even regulating the temperature in the nest. The mother provides food from the larval stage to the first instar (term for a developmental stage in insects) and will continue to defend the aggregated family group in the burrow and on nocturnal foraging excursions. She guards them until they reach maturity after about one month. It is possible for the female to lay a second brood in one season and by the end of August all of the young reach maturity.

== Life cycle ==
Earwig life cycle illustration

European common earwigs can produce either one or two broods per year. Females and males often hibernate together in pairs in underground nests. Females oviposit, or lay, their eggs at the end of winter/ beginning of spring and then expel the male from the nest. These eggs are pale yellow or cream colored and have an elliptical shape.

The mother incubates and cares for the eggs until they hatch. After hatching, the nymphs go through four nymphal instars before reaching maturity and adulthood.

There are two distinct phases of the common earwig's life: the nesting phase and the free-foraging phase. In the nesting phase, family units consist of the male and female pair and then just the female and her nymphs. They may leave the nest at night for foraging excursions, but the mother and her nymphs return to the nest and stay there during the daytime. In the free-foraging phase, different family units will interact, and the nymphs no longer return to their nests after foraging. Instead, they go on long foraging excursions and shelter in trees and crevices. At this point, females may produce a second brood since they have finished raising and tending to the first brood.

== Selfish vs. altruistic behavior ==
Maternal care can drastically increase the survival and development of young earwigs, contributing to their overall reproductive success. However, parental care can be costly as well. It is widely accepted that relations between parents and offspring are shaped by an intersection of selfish and altruistic tendencies that ultimately reflect a compromise of each individual's evolutionary interests. The common earwigs, as well as any species, have to carefully weigh the increased offspring survival benefits and the potential parental fecundity costs associated with parental care.

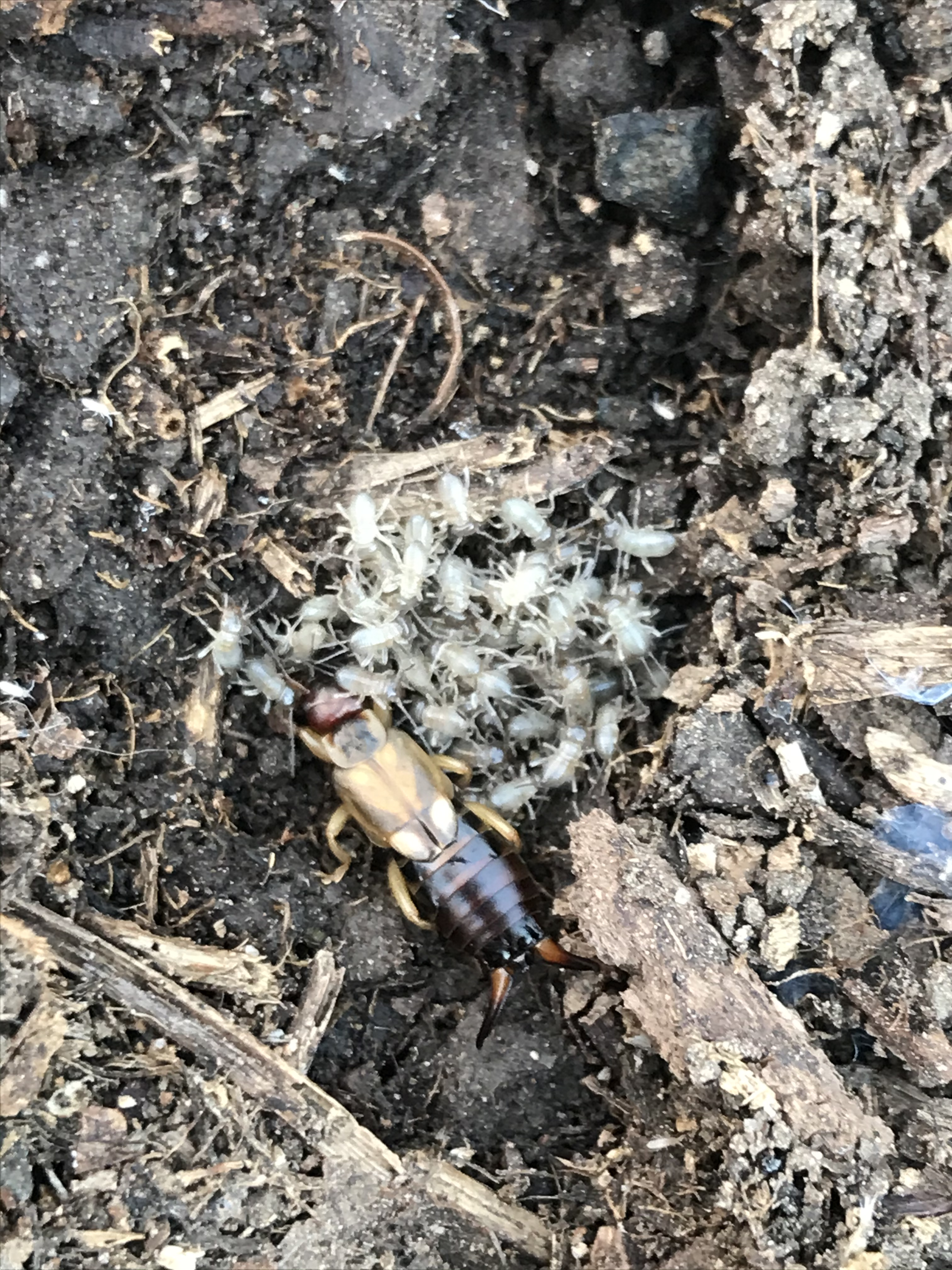
Female and nymphs

One explicit form of altruistic behavior in common earwigs is the fact that females do not reject foreign offspring or eggs and will exhibit the same level of care to foreign eggs as her own eggs. In many species, kin bias prevents parents from investing care and energy into any foreign offspring in order to allow them to more effectively invest in their own offspring thus ensuring that their own genes are passed on. Common earwig mothers, however, will not eliminate foreign eggs and will actually groom, defend, and provide for them to the same extent at which she cares for her own eggs. A likely explanation would be that common earwig mothers simply cannot differentiate between their own eggs and foreign eggs, but this is not the case. Common earwig mothers immediately and regularly apply a bouquet of cuticular hydrocarbons to the surface of their eggs. This bouquet is family specific and allows for differentiation between the mother's own eggs and foreign eggs. This phenomenon indicates that there is limited selection pressures promoting female common earwigs to reject foreign eggs which allows them to display the altruistic behavior of caring for foreign offspring.

== Aggregation ==
European common earwigs aggregate in shelters during the day in groups ranging from 50 to 100 individuals per square meter. Common earwigs seek out dark and humid shelters for use, and they prefer shelters that have been occupied previously due to the presence of an aggregation pheromone. Unfortunately, they have become relatively harmful pests in residential areas—damaging fruits, vegetables, flowers, and some tree fruit crops. Scientists hope to uncover the necessary components of the European common earwig aggregation pheromone because this could allow them to manufacture synthetic aggregation pheromones to use as bait to draw them away from crops and gardens.

=== Pheromones ===
Males, females, and nymphs of the Forficula auricularia species produce aggregation pheromones that trigger specific behavioral responses from members of the same species regardless of their sex or developmental stage. Research shows that common earwigs display significant behavioral responses to both physically accessible and physically inaccessible stimuli. This indicates that common earwigs detect and respond to this aggregation pheromone through olfaction rather than through a mechanism such as contact chemoreception. This helps the earwigs detect shelters to hide in during the daytime after their nocturnal foraging excursions.

Scientists believe that common earwigs produce this aggregation pheromone in their tibial glands, cuticular lipids, or fecal matter. Males, females, and nymphs all exhibit strong responses to the aggregation pheromone. However, there is mounting evidence that the aggregation pheromones are stage-specific meaning depending on the chemical contents of the particular pheromone, it will be more likely to attract either nymphs or adults. Benzoquinones are a component of the aggregation pheromone that attracts adult common earwigs. The same was not true for nymph-stage common earwigs which responded well to experimental aggregation pheromones with and without the benzoquinones.

== Coprophagy ==
Group living comes with many benefits but also many costs. One example is the accumulation of feces in a shared nesting site which can become a breeding ground for a wide variety of fungi and pathogenic bacteria or attract predators and help them locate the nest. Risks escalate in nest-dwelling species that aggregate in large groups such as Forficula auricularia. However, keeping feces in the nesting site has actually proved advantageous for Forficula auricularia despite these concerns. Feces possess antimicrobial properties that can prevent the growth of certain dangerous pathogens. Keeping feces in the nest also fosters allo-coprophagy (consumption of the feces of other members of one's species) which can have positive effects such as promoting the transfer of helpful gut bacteria and providing a food source when food is scarce. In fact, access to sibling feces significantly enhanced the survival rate of nymphs when food was scarce. However, regardless of the scarcity of regular food, nymphs always consume some maternal or nymphal feces which implies that this behavior in earwigs has evolved to have many incentives and is not just a desperate measure to prevent starvation in cases of food scarcity.

== Agricultural impact ==
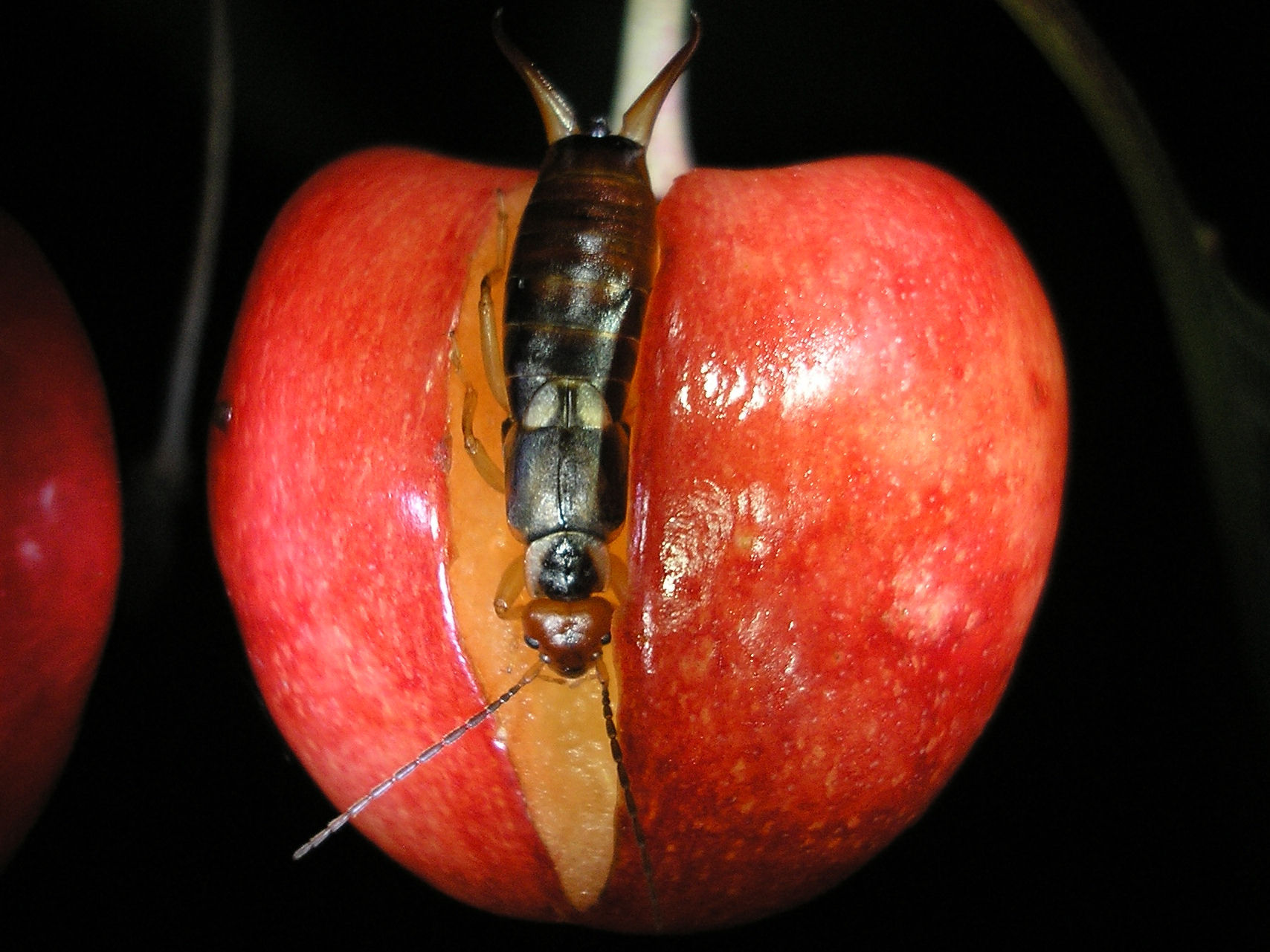
Common earwig feeding on a cherry

Forficula auricularia has been known to cause significant damage to crops, flowers, and fruit orchards when at high population levels. Some of the commercially valuable vegetables it feeds upon include cabbage, cauliflower, chard, celery, lettuce, potato, beet, and cucumber among others. Earwigs readily consume corn (maize) silk and can damage the crop. Among fruits, they have been found to damage apple and pear orchards. On apple trees specifically, Forficula auricularia feed on the fruit (primarily on parts where the fruit is already rotting or cracked) and contaminate the fruit with frass (powdery wood debris that is the result of insect foraging/ boring). They damage young plum and peach trees in early spring when other food is scarce by devouring blossoms and leaves at night. They are often found wedged among petals of fresh cut carnations, roses, dahlia and zinnia.

In addition to the agricultural problems caused, Forficula auricularia emit a foul odor and have a tendency to aggregate together in or near human dwellings.

== Human interaction ==
Control of Forficula auricularia has been attempted using some of its natural enemies, including the parasitoid fly Bigonicheta spinipenni, the fungus Erynia forficulae and Metarhizium anisopliae, as well as many species of birds. Forficula auricularia are host to the nematode Mermis nigrescens which have the ability to manipulate their hosts to seek water. The tachinid flies Triarthria setipennis (Fallen) and Ocytata pallipes were introduced in North America to control Forficula auricularia in the 1920s.

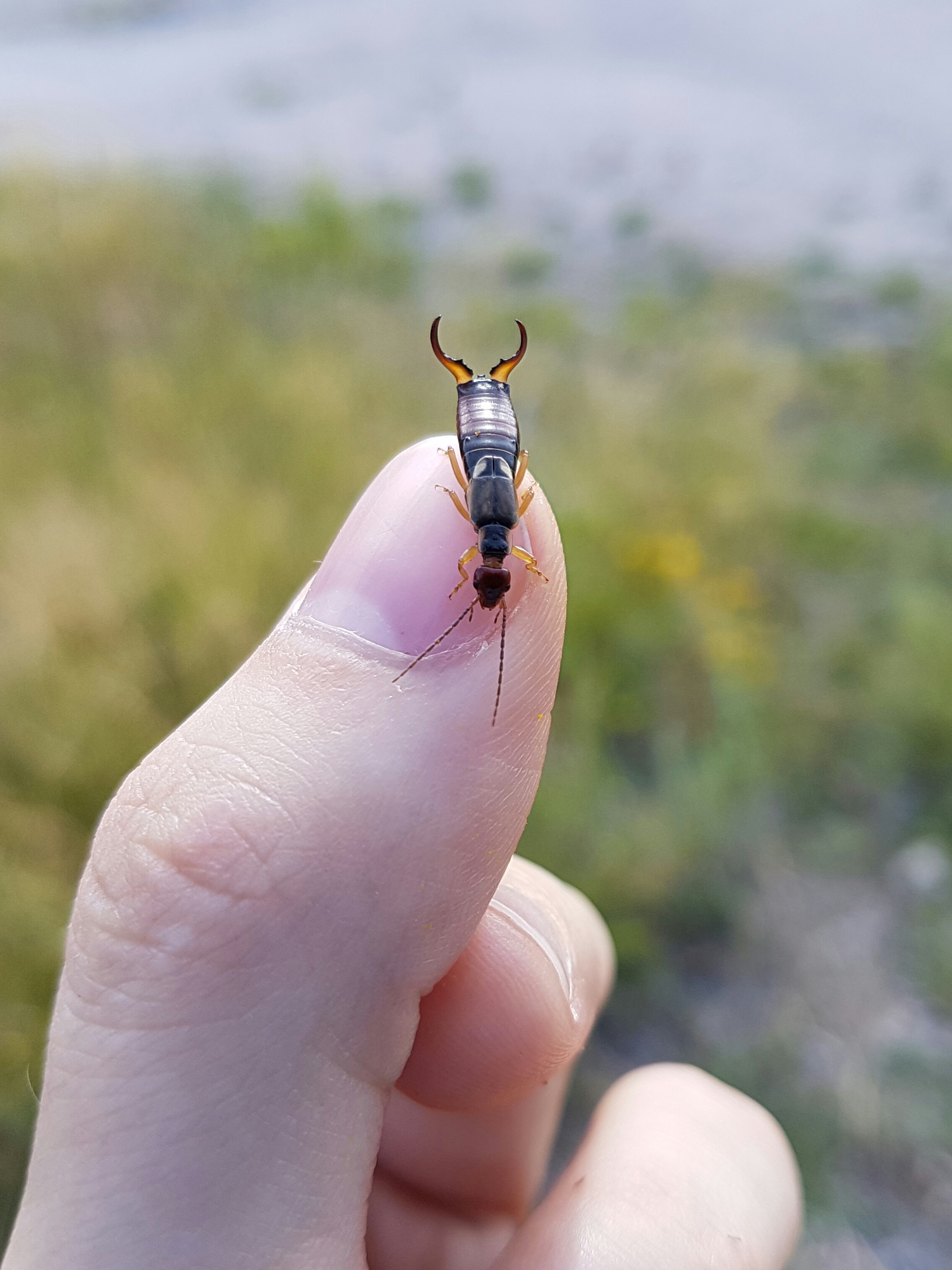
Common earwig on human finger

Insecticides have also been successfully implemented, although commercial products are rarely targeted specifically towards earwigs. Multipurpose insecticides for control of earwigs, grasshoppers, sowbugs and other insects are more common. Diazinon, an organophosphate insecticide, has been known to continue killing Forficula auricularia up to 17 days after initial spraying.

Humans have, however, found beneficial uses of Forficula auricularia in the pest management of other insects. The European common earwig is an omnivore and is also referred to as a generalist predator or scavenger meaning they have many different forms of prey and will feed on whichever prey species is most available. The European earwig is a natural predator of a number of other agricultural pests, including the pear psyllid and several aphid species, and in this regard has been used to control outbreaks of such organisms. The common earwig is an important predator of many different orchard/ crop pests such as the wooly apple aphid (Eriosoma lanigerum) which is one of the most problematic pests in apple orchards. Research has repeatedly shown that low numbers of common earwigs are associated with wooly apple aphid infestations whereas high numbers of common earwigs lead to decreased aphid populations in orchards so much so that farmers sometimes do not even need to use chemicals or pesticides. Therefore, despite their potential adverse effects on some crops, European common earwigs play a crucial role in managing wooly aphid apple populations in apple orchards. Damage to crops by Forficula auricularia is limited as long as there are high population levels of their insect prey.

== See also ==
- List of Dermapterans of Australia
- List of Dermapterans of Sri Lanka
