= List of Dermapterans of Sri Lanka =

Sri Lanka is a tropical island situated close to the southern tip of India. The invertebrate fauna is as large as it is common to other regions of the world. There are about 2 million species of arthropods found in the world, and still is counting.

The following list provides the earwigs currently identified from Sri Lanka.

== Earwig ==
The exact diversity and their biology is well studied within Sri Lanka due to major contributions by Malcolm Burr in 1901, Alan Brindle in 1977 and G.K. Srivastava in 1989–2013. According to a checklist by Steinmann in 1989, 71 species of earwigs may be found in Sri Lanka, distributed between 11 families and 21 genera.

=== Family Anisolabididae ===
- Anisolabis greeni
- Anisolabis kudagae
- Antisolabis kelangi (=Geracodes brincki)
- Epilandex bazyluki (proposed synonymy with Epilandex burri)
- Euborellia annulipes
- Euborellia stali
- Gonolabis electa
- Platylabia major

=== Family Apachyidae ===
- Dendroiketes corticinus

=== Family Chelisochidae ===
- Chelisoches morio
- Schizoproreus delicatulus (=Hamaxas delicatulus)

=== Family Diplatyidae ===
- Diplatys fletcheri
- Diplatys greeni
- Diplatys incisus
- Diplatys porpinquus
- Schizodiplatys malayanus

=== Family Forficulidae ===
- Cordax ceylonicus
- Elaunon bipartitus
- Eparchus insignis
- Hypurgus humeralis
- Obelura tamul
- Obelura neolobophoroides (=Syntonus neolobophoroides)

=== Family Labiduridae ===
- Labidura japonica
- Labidura riparia
- Nala lividipes

=== Family Pygidicranidae ===
- Cranopygia picta (=Acrania picta, Epicranopygia picta)
- Cranopygia nietneri
- Cranopygia parva
- Cranopygia pluto
- Echinosoma parvulum
- Echinosoma trilineatum

=== Family Spongiphoridae ===
- Chaetospania anderssoni
- Chaetospania foliata
- Chaetospania thoracica
- Irdex ceylonensis (=Apovostox ceylonensis)
- Labia curvicauda
- Labia minor
- Paralabella curvicauda (=Circolabia curvicauda)
- Paralabella fruehstorferi (=Circolabia fruehstorferi)
- Paralabella rotundifrons (=Circolabia rotundifrons)
- Spirolabia pillicornis (=Circolabia pillicornis)
- Spongovostox mucronatus (=Paratages mucronatus)
- Spongovostox semiflavus
- Spongovostox tripunctatus

== See also ==
- List of Dermapterans of Australia
