= Euborellia ambigua =

Scientific classification
- Domain: Eukaryota
- Kingdom: Animalia
- Phylum: Arthropoda
- Class: Insecta
- Order: Dermaptera
- Family: Anisolabididae
- Genus: Euborellia
- Species: E. ambigua

Binomial name
- Euborellia ambigua Borelli, 1905

Species of earwig

Euborellia ambigua is a species of earwig in the family Anisolabididae.
