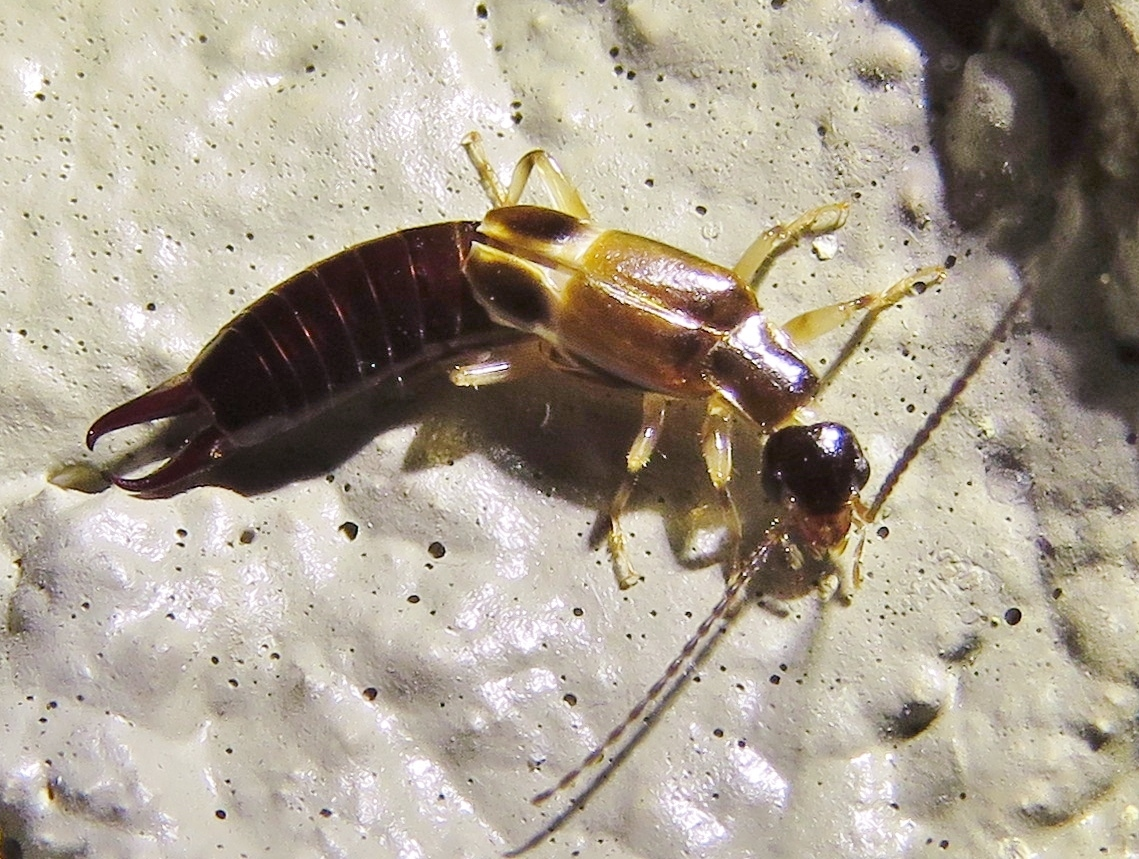

Scientific classification
- Domain: Eukaryota
- Kingdom: Animalia
- Phylum: Arthropoda
- Class: Insecta
- Order: Dermaptera
- Family: Anisolabididae
- Genus: Euborellia
- Species: E. cincticollis

Binomial name
- Euborellia cincticollis Gerstaecker, 1883

= Euborellia cincticollis =

Species of earwig

Euborellia cincticollis is a species of earwig in the family Anisolabididae.
