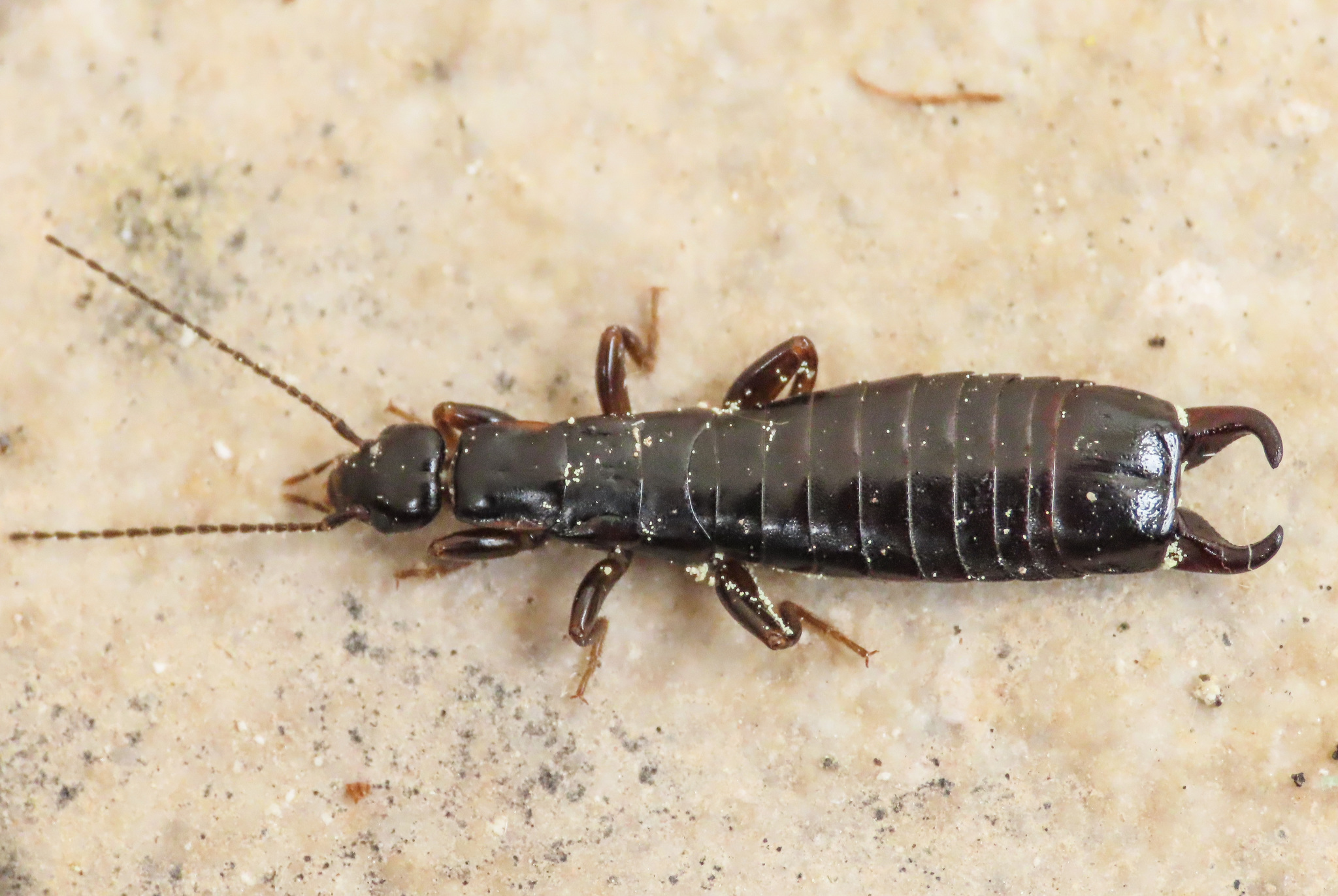

Scientific classification
- Domain: Eukaryota
- Kingdom: Animalia
- Phylum: Arthropoda
- Class: Insecta
- Order: Dermaptera
- Family: Anisolabididae
- Genus: Euborellia
- Species: E. moesta

Binomial name
- Euborellia moesta Gené, 1839

Synonyms
- Euborellia hispanica Steinmann, 1981; Forficesila taurica Motschulsky, 1846; Forficula hispanica Herrich-Schäffer, 1840; Forficula moesta Géné, 1837 (Basionym); Forficula taurica Motschulsky, 1846

= Euborellia moesta =

Species of earwig

Euborellia moesta is a species of mostly southern European earwigs in the family Anisolabididae.
