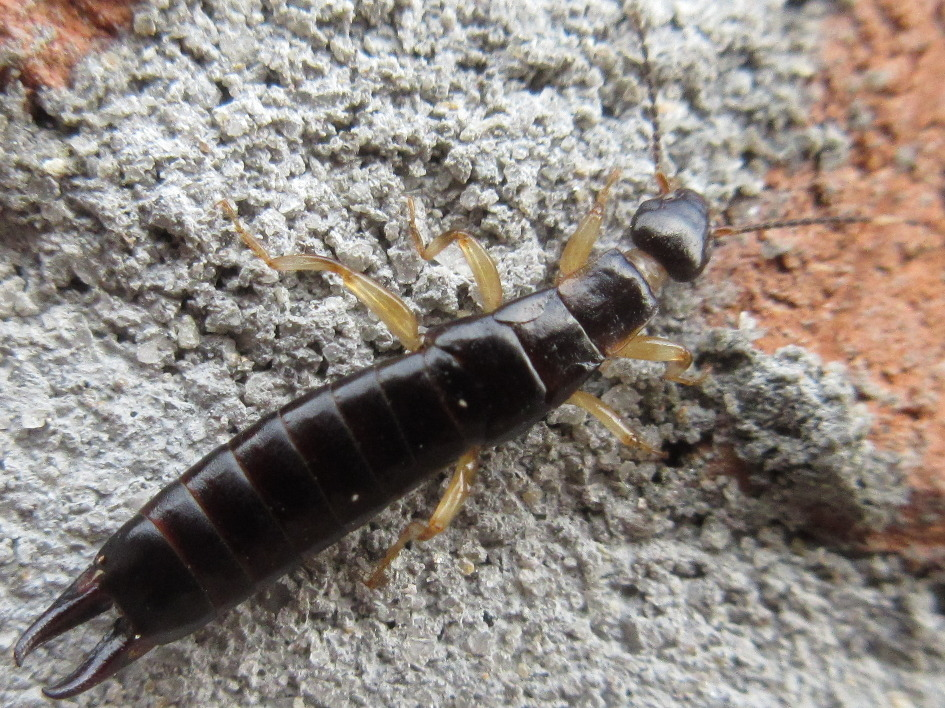

Scientific classification
- Domain: Eukaryota
- Kingdom: Animalia
- Phylum: Arthropoda
- Class: Insecta
- Order: Dermaptera
- Family: Anisolabididae
- Genus: Euborellia
- Species: E. annulata

Binomial name
- Euborellia annulata Lucas

= Euborellia annulata =

Species of insect

Euborellia annulata is a species of earwig in the family Anisolabididae. It is used for the control of the Asian Corn Borer, a moth of the order Lepidoptera, and a pest of corn in East Asia.
