= Euborellia plebeja =

Scientific classification
- Domain: Eukaryota
- Kingdom: Animalia
- Phylum: Arthropoda
- Class: Insecta
- Order: Dermaptera
- Family: Anisolabididae
- Genus: Euborellia
- Species: E. plebeja

Binomial name
- Euborellia plebeja (Dohrn, 1863)

Species of earwig

Euborellia plebeja is a species of earwig in the family Anisolabididae. Like other members of the Anisolabididae family, this species has an elongated virga, a sclerotized tube that is part of the male genitalia.

== Reproduction ==
An Indian study showed that the number of eggs laid varies from 21–40; the eggs hatch within 7–15 days. There are four nymphal instars. Although the sexes are not distinct during the nymphal instars stage of development, they can be differentiated in the adult stage. All parts of the body increased in size during nymphal growth except for the 3rd antennal segment which remains almost constant in length.

== Distribution ==
Euboriella plebeja has been collected from Sumatra, Samoa, Guam, Madagascar, Korea, India and South America.
