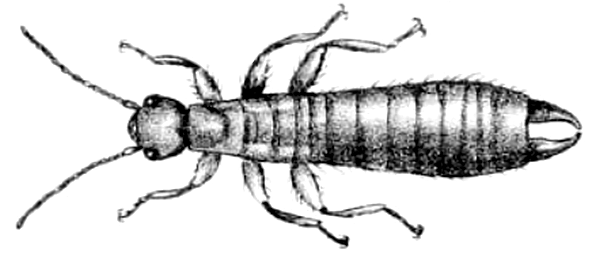

Scientific classification
- Domain: Eukaryota
- Kingdom: Animalia
- Phylum: Arthropoda
- Class: Insecta
- Order: Dermaptera
- Family: Anisolabididae
- Genus: Anisolabis
- Species: A. subarmata

Binomial name
- Anisolabis subarmata (Kirby, 1900)

Synonyms
- Labia subarmata Kirby, 1900

= Christmas Island earwig =

Species of earwig

The Christmas Island earwig (Anisolabis subarmata) is a species of earwig in the family Anisolabididae.

== Taxonomy ==
The Christmas Island earwig was described as a new species in 1900 by English entomologist William Forsell Kirby. The holotype had been collected by Charles William Andrews on Christmas Island. Kirby placed it in the genus Labia, with a scientific name of Labia subarmata.

== Biology and conservation ==
Very little is known about the Christmas Island earwig, as it is one of twenty-four invertebrate species endemic to Christmas Island that have not been detected since 1902.

== See also ==
- List of Dermapterans of Australia
