= Paul Nazaroff =

Russian geologist known for revolutionary ideas

Paul Nazaroff (Pavel Stepanovich Nazarov; Russian: Па́вел Степа́нович Наза́ров; died 1942) was a Russian geologist and writer who was caught up in the Russian Revolution, and became the leader of a plot to overthrow Bolshevik rule in Central Asia.

== Biography ==
He was born in Orenburg about 1890, the son of the local mayor and mine owner. He qualified as a geologist at the University of Moscow. In August 1918 he was living openly at Tashkent under the local Soviet, while aiding both White and British Forces in Central Asia with information and assistance to help forestall the spread of Bolshevik power in the region. Arrested by the CHEKA in October 1918, he was one of the main organisers of a coup which temporarily overthrew the Tashkent Soviet on 6 January 1919, and incidentally freed him from prison. This was defeated when the railway workers changed sides when they learned that the new government was royalist and reactionary. Nazaroff himself managed to evade the pursuing Bolsheviks and escaped through the mountains to Kashgar in China in early 1920, as he tells in his book Hunted Through Central Asia (translated into English in 1932 and reissued in 2002).

There in Kashgar he continued to be an important source of information for both the Chinese and British authorities, but in August 1924, he decided to leave in wake of the Chinese Government's recognition of Soviet Russia. He then made another difficult journey over the Himalayas to Kashmir and India. He later moved to London in search of work as a geologist, before accepting an assignment in Equatorial Africa, far as he hoped from Soviet agents. It was there he met Malcolm Burr who encouraged him to write (and translated) an account of his adventures. Later he settled in South Africa where he died in 1942 at Johannesburg. He was married but his wife does not seem to have escaped or survived the civil war. Peter Hopkirk's Setting the East Ablaze also gives details of Nazaroff's adventures.

== Published works ==
- Hunted through Central Asia, Paul Nazaroff, 1932.
- Moved On! from Kashgar to Kashmir, Paul Nazaroff, 1935.
- Kapchigai Defile: the journal of Paul Nazaroff, Paul Nazaroff, 1980.
- What are the Zimbabwe Ruins? The solution of their secret, Extract from: Blackwood's Magazine, June 1931, pp. 765–792.
