= Euborellia stali =

Scientific classification
- Domain: Eukaryota
- Kingdom: Animalia
- Phylum: Arthropoda
- Class: Insecta
- Order: Dermaptera
- Family: Anisolabididae
- Genus: Euborellia
- Species: E. stali

Binomial name
- Euborellia stali (Dohrn, 1864)

Species of earwig

Euborellia stali is a species of earwig in the family Anisolabididae.
