= Mark Elgar =

Australian behavioural and evolutionary ecologist

Professor Mark Adrian Elgar
- Died: Melbourne, Australia
- Education: Griffith University
- Known for: Research on sexual selection, social behaviour and chemical communication
- Scientific career
- Fields: Evolutionary biology
- Workplaces: University of Melbourne
- Thesis: Flocking and foraging strategies in house sparrows Passer domesticus L (1985)
- Doctoral advisor: Nick Davies
- Website: https://markaelgar.com/

Mark Adrian Elgar (25 July 1957 – 9 August 2025) was an Australian behavioural and evolutionary ecologist, based at the University of Melbourne since 1991. He established his reputation with research on bird foraging strategies and sexual cannibalism in spiders, but later explored a variety of evolutionary questions around sexual selection, social behaviour and chemical communication.

== Research career ==
In January 1980, Elgar completed his Bachelor of Science with Honours at Griffith University. From 1982 to 1985, he undertook his PhD research at Cambridge University under Nick Davies, studying the flocking and foraging strategies of house sparrows. According to Elgar, Davies taught him "the value of asking questions that can be resolved by simple experiments, and of treating colleagues respectfully." Elgar was also influenced by evolutionary biologist John Maynard Smith, who attended one of Elgar's seminars at Sussex University and was enthusiastic about his research.

Following the completion of his PhD, Elgar served as a Science and Engineering Research Fellow at University of Oxford (1985–1987). He then returned to Australia, working as a University Research Fellow (1987–1989) and Queen Elizabeth II Research Fellow (1989–1990) at University of New South Wales. He joined the University of Melbourne in 1991, where he became a professor in 2005. There he served in several roles including Elected Member, University Council (2004–2007); Associate Dean (Graduate Programs), Faculty of Science (2006–2009); and Domain Leader (Ecology & Evolution), School of BioSciences (2018–2019). From 2013 to 2016 he was Member, College of Experts, Australian Research Council.

Elgar served as President of the Australasian Evolution Society and Councillor for the International Society for Behavioral Ecology. He was editor-in-chief of the journals Behavioral Ecology (2006–2011) and Australian Journal of Zoology (2007–2011), associate editor for Behavioral Ecology and Sociobiology (1994–2016), and Field Chief Editor for Frontiers in Ecology and Evolution (2016–2024).

In 2021, Elgar opined that an increase in wasp numbers in residential areas may be due to bushfires destroying their nests in natural environments.

== Personal life ==
In the final years of his life, Elgar was diagnosed with a rare form of cancer. He died on 9 August 2025, and was survived by his two daughters.
