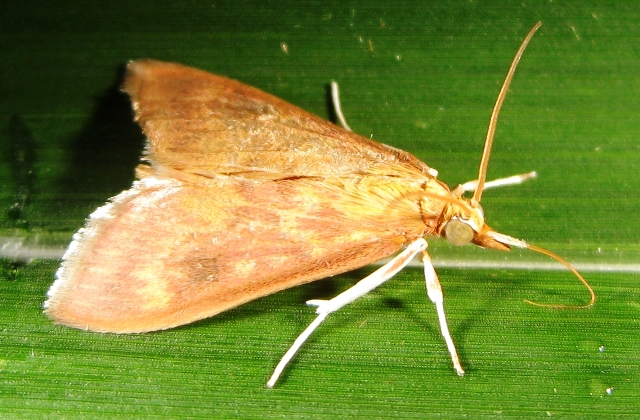

Scientific classification
- Kingdom: Animalia
- Phylum: Arthropoda
- Clade: Pancrustacea
- Class: Insecta
- Order: Lepidoptera
- Family: Crambidae
- Genus: Ostrinia
- Species: O. furnacalis

Binomial name
- Ostrinia furnacalis (Guenée, 1854)
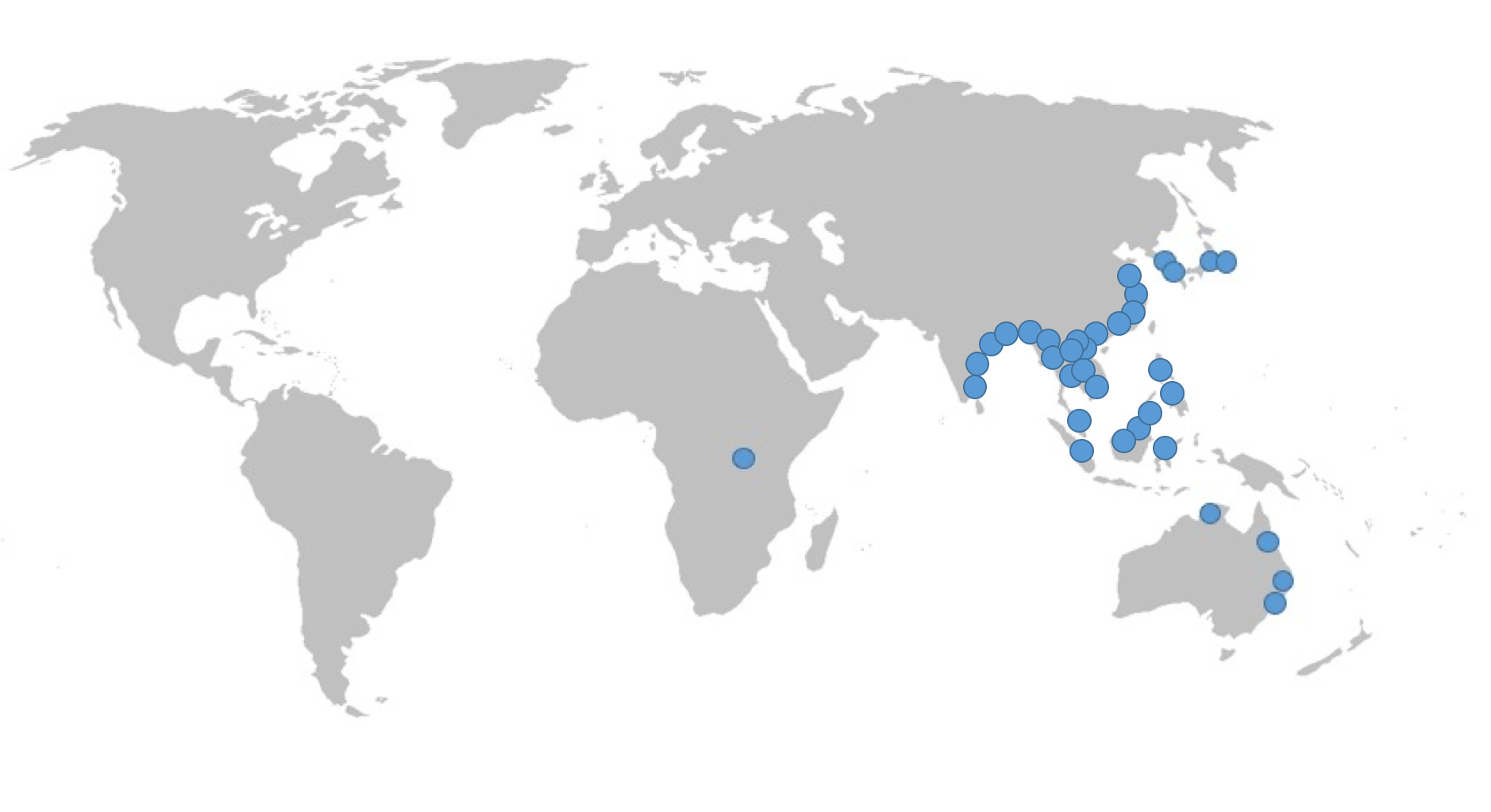
- Distribution of Ostrinia furnacalis

Synonyms
- Botys furnacalis Guenée, 1854; Botys damoalis Walker, 1859; Botys salentialis Snellen, 1880; Pyrausta polygoni Dyar, 1905; Pyrausta vastatrix Schultze, 1908; Spilodes kodzukalis Matsumura, 1897

= Ostrinia furnacalis =

Species of moth

Ostrinia furnacalis is a species of moth in the family Crambidae, the grass moths. It was described by Achille Guenée in 1854 and is known by the common name Asian corn borer since this species is found in Asia and feeds mainly on corn crop. The moth is found from China to Australia, including in Java, Sulawesi, the Philippines, Borneo, New Guinea, the Solomon Islands, and Micronesia. The Asian corn borer is part of the species complex, Ostrinia, in which members are difficult to distinguish based on appearance. Other Ostrinia such as O. orientalis, O. scapulalis, O. zealis, and O. zaguliaevi can occur with O. furnacalis, and the taxa can be hard to tell apart.

This moth exhibits unique acoustic mimicry of a predator by mirroring the echolocation calls of bats in order to temporarily paralyze female moths and make it easier to mate. It is also well known as being an agricultural pest on several crops in the western Pacific region of Asia, especially on corn. The Asian corn borer is second only to maize downy mildew as the most prevalent corn pest. There is currently extensive research on eradicating this pest from corn crop in Asia, including the use of biological agents and toxins.

== Geographic range and habitat ==
The Asian corn borer is most commonly found throughout Asia and Southeast Asia. More specifically, it is located in China, the Philippines, Indonesia, Taiwan, Malaysia, Thailand, Sri Lanka, India, Bangladesh, Japan, Korea, Vietnam, Lao, Myanmar, and Cambodia. There are also a limited number in the Solomon Islands, Africa, and parts of Australia. The Asian corn borer thrives in tropical regions because in these countries there is continuous farming of its host crop through the year.

== Food resources ==
While the main food source for the Asian corn borer is corn, it also consumes and destroys bell pepper, cotton, hops, millet, pearl millet, foxtail millet, sugarcane, sorghum, and ginger. In addition, it can be found on a number of wild plants, as well, such as wormwoods, Job's tears, knotweeds, wild sugarcane, Johnson grass, and para grass.

=== Larvae and pupae ===
The larvae work their way through the host plant (typically maize), by beginning to feed on the underside, or whorl, of the leaves. Younger instars typically feed on the tassel of the plant, and then move on to feed in the ear. There they feed on the silk and kernels of the corn plant. Later instar stages begin to make their way into the plant by feeding on stalks. This allows them to be able to form pupae within the stems of the plant. Additionally, if the food supply of the current plant is limited, the larvae create silk that serves as a connection between plants so that they can travel from plant to plant. They are then transported by the wind through a process known as ballooning, where the strands catch the wind in order to transport the larvae. They also use existing silk strand connections to other plants as trails where they can hope to find a better food source that can also serve them as a location for pupation.

== Life cycle ==
=== Eggs ===
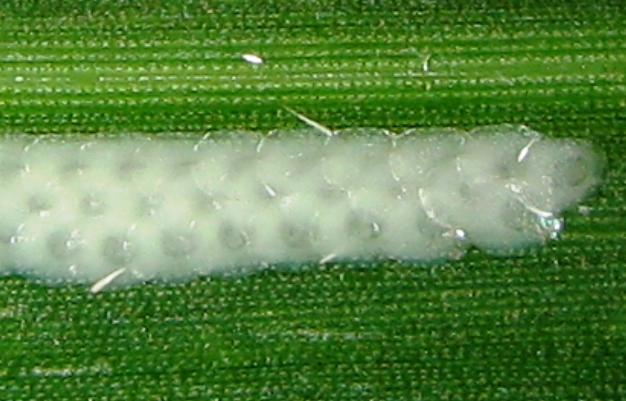
O. furnacalis egg cluster

The eggs of the Asian corn borer are found grouped at the base of and under the leaves of corn plants in masses of 25 to 50 eggs. They appear scaly and are laid in overlapping groups, resembling roof tiles and fish scales. The eggs are approximately half a millimeter long and white, turning black before emergence, which occurs 3 to 10 days after incubation.

=== Larvae ===
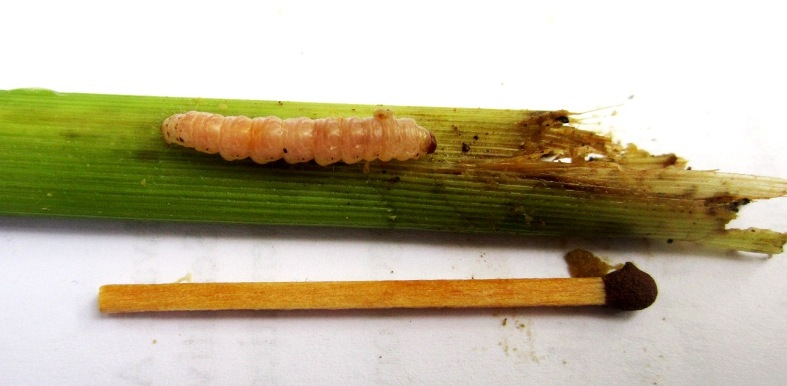
O. furnacalis larva with damage done to corn ear shown

The Asian corn borer goes through six instar stages while in the larval phase. The first-instar larva is pinkish with dark spots and a dark head. The late instar larva is yellow brown with dark spots and reaches up to 2.9 centimeters in length.

=== Pupa ===
After 3 to 4 weeks, the caterpillar larvae transform into pupae for 6 to 9 days in a cocoon in the soil or stem of the plant, before becoming moths.

=== Adult ===
The adult moths have distinct color pattern for each sex which makes them easy to identify. The females are pale yellow or tan with darker wavy bands across their wings. Females also tend to be larger than males with a wingspan of 20–30 mm. Meanwhile, males are darker with a tapering abdomen and similar bands across their wings and tend to be slightly smaller in size than the females. The adult moths live for 10 to 24 days. During this lifetime, female moths can lay up to 1500 eggs.

== Parasites ==
Natural enemies of the moth include several parasites such as the tachinid fly Lydella grisescens, the braconid wasp Macrocentrus cingulum, and the ichneumon wasp Eriborus terebrans. It is also susceptible to the entomopathogenic fungi Beauveria bassiana and Nosema furnacalis. Additionally, the Asian corn borer has the potential to develop the insect disease muscardine.

== Mating ==
=== Mimicry ===
During courtship, the male Asian corn borer produces an ultrasound call by rubbing scales on its wings against scales on its thorax. This ultrasound call acoustically mimics that of the bat echolocation call. The males take advantage of this predator cue in order to seduce a mate via sensory trapping, which are signals that mimic those of a predator in order to exploit the adaptive, neural responses of signal receivers. The female responds to this signal by becoming motionless, making it easier for males to mate since they are not effective at copulating. This predator cue behavior is exhibited in several other species including Goodeinae fish, swordtail characins, and water mites.

=== Pheromones ===
This species has a pheromone communication system used during mating. The females contain an extruding sex pheromone gland which releases the pheromone, composed of tetradecanl acetate (14Ac), (E)-12-tetradecenyl acetate (E12–14Ac) and (Z)-12-tetradecenyl acetate (Z12–14Ac). This gland is composed of thick cell layers and is located between abdominal segments in the moth. In response to the female pheromones, males typically extrude hair-pencils, or pheromone signaling structures, prior to copulation, making it easier for the male to mate.

=== Offspring ratios ===
This species has been known to have a skewed sex ratio occurring at a low frequency. The skewed ratio is caused by a parasitic bacterial infection, Wolbachia, that feminizes the male offspring. Many female moths produce mostly female offspring, and some broods are entirely female. This is supported by evidence that the antibiotic application of tetracycline, an agent that kills Wolbachia, produces all-male offspring broods. Additionally, the female-biased sex ratio can be maternally inherited. While the skewed ratios have only been observed in three populations in Japan, this phenomenon is not unheard of. In other taxa such as wasps and various crustaceans, infection with Wolbachia can skew sex ratios.

== Physiology ==
=== Flight ===
The adult moths are known for being strong, nocturnal fliers, and can fly up to several miles in a single night. Reasons for these long flights are speculated to be because of mating, since there is a negative correlation between flight duration and egg production. Lower humidity conditions inhibit the flight ability of the adult.

=== Antenna ===
The Asian corn borer has important receptors on their antennae that enable the moth to detect olfactory cues for mate attraction and oviposition. Males show strong activity of their antennae to the chemicals released by females. Each antenna on both sexes also has six types of sensilla. These include chemical receptors, mechanical receptors, temperature receptors, and hygroreceptors.

=== Diapause ===
Diapause is the delayed development of an insect due to unfavorable environmental conditions. Ostrinia furnacalis is known to typically diapause over winter months. During diapause, it has been observed that the oxygen levels of the moth are relatively stable and remain at a high level. However, this is not the case with glycerol levels. Though glycerol levels are low in October and November, they markedly increase during December and January. In other words, glycerol levels, which are associated with survival rates, increase with increasing temperature. This is considered a form of cold weather resistance for the moth.

== Human interaction ==
=== Agriculture ===
This insect can cause devastating losses in a corn field. In the Philippines losses of 20 to 80% have been reported. In Taiwan it has reached 95%, and in the Marianas, 100%. The moth larva does most of the damage by feeding on almost all parts of the plant. It destroys the fruit when it bores into the ear to feed on the silk and kernels, and the stem when it creates a cocoon for pupation. It also invades the tassels, where it feeds on pollen.

=== Control ===
==== Biological control ====
One method used to control the moth in Asia is the wasp Trichogramma ostriniae, a native parasitoid of the moth's eggs. This method of biological pest control has shown varied success. Several other species have been used as well including Trichogramma dendrolimi, Trichogramma chilonalis in Guam, although it has been less effective, and Trichogramma evanescens in the Philippines. The earwig, Euborellia annulata, is also used for biological control of this pest. Some bacteria that inhabit the gut of entomopathogenic nematodes, specifically Xenorhabdus and Photorhabdus, have the pathogenic potential to kill Ostrinia furnacalis within 48 hours. Another method used to control the spread of this pest is to detassel the corn. This reduces the larval populations that feed on the tassels.

==== Toxins ====
Like the European corn borer, this moth is susceptible to Bt corn, a crop which has been genetically modified to produce Bt toxin that harms the moth. This corn has been introduced to the Philippines, where it has been monitored to gather data on its relationship with the moth. It has been successful, producing higher yields than conventional corn breeds. Bt cotton has also had some success in China. Another method of controlling the pest in cotton crops is to intercrop with corn, growing some corn plants in the cotton field. The moth overwinters in corn plants instead of the cotton plants in order to relieve the cotton plants of their moth loads. Bt-based pesticides are available, and conventional chemical pesticides are used. Corn breeding is continuing in the search for varieties resistant to the moth.
