= Ostrinia scapulalis =

Scientific classification
- Kingdom: Animalia
- Phylum: Arthropoda
- Clade: Pancrustacea
- Class: Insecta
- Order: Lepidoptera
- Family: Crambidae
- Genus: Ostrinia
- Species: O. scapulalis

Binomial name
- Ostrinia scapulalis (Walker, 1859)

Synonyms
- Botys scapulalis Walker, 1859; Ostrinia scapulalis assamensis Mutuura & Munroe, 1970; Ostrinia narynensis Mutuura & Munroe, 1970; Ostrinia orientalis Mutuura & Munroe, 1970; Ostrinia orientalis kurilensis Mutuura & Munroe, 1970; Ostrinia orientalis ussuriensis Mutuura & Munroe, 1970; Ostrinia scapulalis pacifica Mutuura & Munroe, 1970; Ostrinia scapulalis perpacifica Mutuura & Munroe, 1970; Ostrinia scapulalis rossica Mutuura & Munroe, 1970; Ostrinia scapulalis subpacifica Mutuura & Munroe, 1970

Species of moth

Ostrinia scapulalis, the adzuki bean borer or adzuki bean worm, is a species of moth in the family Crambidae. It was described by Francis Walker in 1859. It is one of 20 moths in the genus Ostrinia and is of Eurasian origin. The larvae have a gray mid-dorsal line and can be light pink or beige. The adult adzuki bean borer has a yellowish-brown forewing with jagged lines and variable darker shading, with a wingspan that ranges from 20 to 32 mm. The moths of this species are nocturnal and tend to be attracted to light.

The larvae mainly feed on Artemisia vulgaris, but may also feed on maize. They are typically found in corn fields, gardens, and commercial crop plantations, and they are usually active from April to October. They are primarily found in Japan, although they can be found in other regions of Asia and Europe, as well.

== Distribution ==
O. scapulalis is most commonly found in the western (from western Europe to Russia) and eastern (from eastern China to Japan) Palearctic regions. However, this species' distribution may be wider than that, and may even be continuous from Europe to Japan. Japan has a significantly large concentration of moths, and the bulk of studies performed there are conducted on the adzuki bean borer. The moth thrives in the habitats and the natural resources found in both the western and eastern Palearctic regions.

== Enemies ==
=== Diseases ===
Wolbachia bacteria are responsible for one of the most prevalent diseases for O. scapulalis. These bacteria are maternally transmitted and their presence can cause many reproductive abnormalities in arthropods such as the adzuki bean borer. Namely, the bacteria can convert genetic males into functional females in a process known as feminization. This can skew the sex ratio of a population, which may in turn lower reproductive rates.

=== Predators ===
Predators of O. scapulalis include:

- Lizards (Lacertilia)
- Cats (Felis catus)
- Dogs (Canis lupus familiaris)
- Rodents (Rodentia)
- Insectivores: Birds, owls, and bats
- Humans, specifically farmers (Homo sapiens)

=== Parasites ===
The Ostrinia species are victim to many natural parasites:

- Lydella thompsoni
- Pseudoperichaeta nigrolineata
- Macrocentrus cingulum
- Microsporidia (fungus)

While L. thompsoni and P. nigrolineata both are known to parasitize other hosts, M. cingulum is primarily associated with Ostrinia. Certain parasites such as Trichogramma brassicae are also used for biological control.

=== Defense mechanisms ===
The adzuki bean borer is able to emit ultrasonic pulses at 40 kHz. This can be used in the context of mating, but it can also be used to fend off predators that use ultrasound as a locating mechanism. The adzuki bean borer generates these pulses and flies erratically to confuse and escape predation, specifically from bats.

== Parental care ==
=== Oviposition ===
The lifecycle of O. scapulalis begins during oviposition. Oviposition behavior has been found to be influenced by oviposition-deterring pheromones, also known as host-marking pheromones (MPs), that emanate from egg masses laid by other conspecific females. A female that is ready to oviposit tends to reject hosts that are marked with MPs to favor unmarked hosts.

== Life history ==
=== Sex-ratio distorters ===
Multiple studies have shown that a significant amount of sex-ratio distortion occurs in O. scapulalis. Two mechanisms of sex-ratio distortion are believed to occur in this moth. One involves the bacterial genus Wolbachia (SRw+ trait) and another does not (SRw– trait). These traits may have been inherited from a common ancestor between O. furnicalis and O. scapulalis. The physiological reason as to why these traits induce a female-biased sex ratio is unknown. The trait appearance is suggested to be due to feminization, male killing at the larval stage, or meiotic drive.

== Genetics ==
=== Subspecies ===
O. scapulalis is one of eight Ostrinia species that are found in Japan. An unusually low level of divergence is seen between the adzuki bean borer and the other seven Ostrinia species. Specifically, O. orientalis and O. nubilalis have a low level of divergence from O. scapulalis. However, the adzuki bean borer is morphologically distinct from the other two. A recent study showed that major quantitative trait loci (QTLs) are associated with the mating isolation between O. nubilalis and O. scapulalis. Specifically, the QTLs associated with pheromone characteristics were present on distinct linkage groups. Additional studies are required to target other aspects of the moths' genetic architectures, which may explain their reproductive isolation.

Other genetic differences may serve as the basis for other behavioral differences between the moths, such as the fact that O. scapulalis, a mugwort-race moth, emerges from the pupal stage 10 days earlier than maize-race moths.

== Mating ==
Ultrasound emission by O. scapulalis

=== Mate searching behavior ===
In most species, females are viewed as the more choosy sex with regards to the attributes of a given male due to a larger investment in a single gamete (the ova) by the female, but O. scapulalis demonstrates behavior that would indicate the opposite being true. Females may pursue males (using species-specific pheromones) and males vary their investment in females of varying quality due to a significant cost of copulation to the male. This cost includes activities such as the production of sperm, territorial guarding, and parental care. Males were found to invest less in females that were older, smaller, or water deprived, indicating that the adzuki bean borer does change its reproductive investment due to the quality of the mate.

This alteration in reproductive investment also changes with respect to the age of the males. More modulation occurs with older males, demonstrating that mate-searching behavior is influenced by female condition and male age. While older males were found to have higher rates of mating success than younger males, this was merely found to be due to a higher frequency of courtship and not reflective of female preference.

=== Female/male interactions ===
==== Female pheremones ====
Recently, gas chromatography has been used to identify the female sex chromosomes of O. scapulalis. The pheromone cocktail has been identified as a combination of these compounds: (Z)-11-tetradecenyl acetate (Z11–14:OAc) and (E)-11-tetradecenyl acetate (E11–14:OAc) in a ratio of 100:3. In any single sex pheromone gland of the female moth, there is approximately 6.6 ng of Z11–14: OAc and 2.4 ng of E11–14:OAc present on average though it varies significantly. Variations in the ratio of one chemical to the other is largely influenced by genetic factors. Wind-tunnel bioassays have shown that the binary blend of the two pheromones impact male behavior in the same way that a virgin female does, thus linking male behavior to the pheromones released by virgin females.

==== Male ultrasound courtship ====
The male adzuki bean borer is primarily known to produce ultrasounds during courtship. This helps with courtship since the ultrasound renders the female motionless, making copulation easier. These emitted pulses continue for an extended time at a frequency of 40 kHz. However, the amplitude of this modulation is significantly altered between different populations, which has been especially correlated to the surrounding geography of the population.

==== Other courtship behavior ====
Outside of using ultrasound, other courtship behaviors are observed. The male adzuki bean borer generally approaches from the rear of the female. As he does so, he fans his wings to appear larger. The male then vibrates the raised wings and extends his genital claspers. His abdomen is also extended at the targeted female. If the display is successful, the female accepts the male. If the display is not successful, she may walk or fly away.

==== Nuptial gifts ====
The male adzuki bean borer provides nuptial gifts to the female in the form of proteins, carbohydrates, minerals, and sugars that are included in the spermatophore. These nuptial gifts are known to significantly improve the female's reproductive output. For example, the protein is thought to help with egg production. The resources that are required of the male to do this generally are derived from larval sources. This proves to be at a substantial cost to the male. Since a tradeoff exists between investment in current reproduction and future reproduction, more investment in reproduction should be made towards the end of the moth's lifespan. As this idea predicts, older males were found to produce significantly larger spermatophores than younger males, thus indicating a greater reproductive effort. In contrast, neither female fecundity nor longevity was affected by age.

==== Multiple mating ====
Polygyny is common in the adzuki bean borer. Males of the species mate multiply and are polygynous, although the females of the species mate only once and are monandrous. Males follow the many traces of female pheromones and land close to females before performing a courtship ritual and mating (transferring spermatophores to the female). This results in the majority of parental care being provided by the female of the species, since male desertion is common.

== Physiology ==
=== Hearing ===
==== Sound generation ====
O. scapulalis is able to produce ultrasonic sounds by rubbing the rough scales of its wings against other rough scales that are found in the midsection of its thorax. This action is key to producing sounds at various frequencies depending on how fast or slow the moth takes this action. The average frequency of sound generated is 40 kHz.

==== Hearing organs ====
These moths have tympanal ears sensitive to ultrasound. Tympanal organs consist of a chordotonal organ wrapped in tracheal epithelial tissue. The tympanum is a thin piece of transparent tissue that vibrates in response to ultrasonic sound. The tympanal organ is tuned to the sounds that bat calls make. Additionally, this kind of hearing is less prevalent in bat-free areas. This suggests that the ears of these moths have evolved to fend off insectivores, including bats that emit ultrasonic sounds.

=== Olfaction ===
Olfaction is primarily observed as a key factor in males, because males must be able to distinguish the female pheromones of its own species from those of other similar species. Male odorant receptors consist of olfactory sensilla. These sensilla are small sensory organs that may protrude or lie under the cuticle of the moth. In the adzuki bean borer, they are specifically sensitive to pheromones.

=== Diapause ===
Diapause is considered as a delay in animal development due to multiple environmental factors. O. scapulalis is known to partake in this behavior. The larvae of this species diapause throughout winter in the upper portion of the stem of their host plant. The moth's main host plant in which they diapause is the mugwort, although they also are found in the maize and hop stems. The reason for the preference for the location of diapause is the identity of parasitoids found in both. Their prevalences differ between maize and mugwort, resulting in differing benefits during diapause.
