= Euborellia jeekeli =

Scientific classification
- Domain: Eukaryota
- Kingdom: Animalia
- Phylum: Arthropoda
- Class: Insecta
- Order: Dermaptera
- Family: Anisolabididae
- Genus: Euborellia
- Species: E. jeekeli

Binomial name
- Euborellia jeekeli Srivastava, 1985

Species of earwig

Euborellia jeekeli is a species of earwig in the family Anisolabididae.
