= Malcolm Burr =

English author & entomologist (1878-1954)

Dr Malcolm Burr
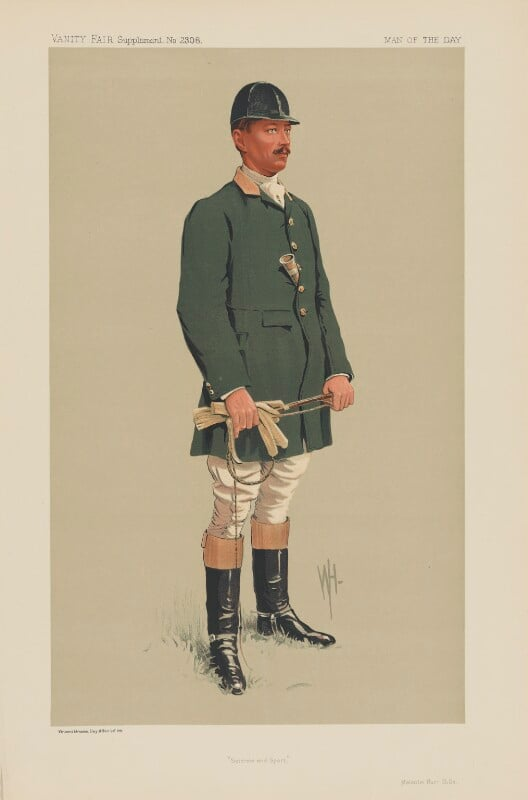
- Born: 6 July 1878; Blackheath, London, England
- Died: 13 July 1954 (aged 76); Istanbul, Turkey
- Education: Radley College, New College, Oxford
- Known for: Dermaptera, Orthoptera
- Scientific career
- Fields: Entomology

Malcolm Burr (6 July 1878 - 13 July 1954) was an English author, translator, entomologist, and geologist. He taught English at the School of Economics in Istanbul, and spent most of his life in Turkey.

== Life ==
Burr was a noted specialist of earwigs (Dermaptera) and crickets and grasshoppers (Orthoptera). He was the first to classify earwigs on the basis of copulatory organs, and the diversity and biology of the earwigs of Sri Lanka is well studied due to major contributions by Burr in 1901.

He also met and befriended the White émigré Paul Nazaroff, whose works he translated from Russian into English (including Hunted through Central Asia).

== Private life ==
He married Clara Millicent Goode in 1903 and they had four daughters, Gabrille Ruth Millicent, Rowena Frances, Yolanda Elizabeth and another.

== Bibliography ==
- Burr, Malcolm, 1878-1954 (1910). "Dermaptera (Earwigs)". The Fauna of British India, Including Ceylon and Burma. London: Taylor and Francis. doi:10.5962/bhl.title.8271. LCCN 10011886. OCLC 6081949. OL 7018915M. Wikidata Q51462985.
- Burr, Malcolm, 1878-1954 (1913), Orthoptères. Catalogue Systématique et descriptif des Collections Zoologiques du Baron Edm. de Selys Longchamps (in French), Brussels, doi:10.5962/bhl.title.9186, OCLC 9605023, OL 23323929M, Wikidata Q51515400
- Burr, Malcolm (1931). In Bolshevik Siberia, the land of ice and exile. London: H.F. & G. Witherby.
- Burr, Malcolm (1933). A Fossicker in Angola.
- Dersu the Trapper (translated by Malcolm Burr), published by Secker & Warburg, London 1939 (First English edition)
- Hunted through Central Asia. On the run from Lenin's Secret Police (book) (translated by Malcolm Burr), published by Oxford University Press, London 1932 (First English edition)

== See also ==
- Epilandex burri, a species of earwig named after Burr
- List of Vanity Fair (British magazine) caricatures (1910–14)
