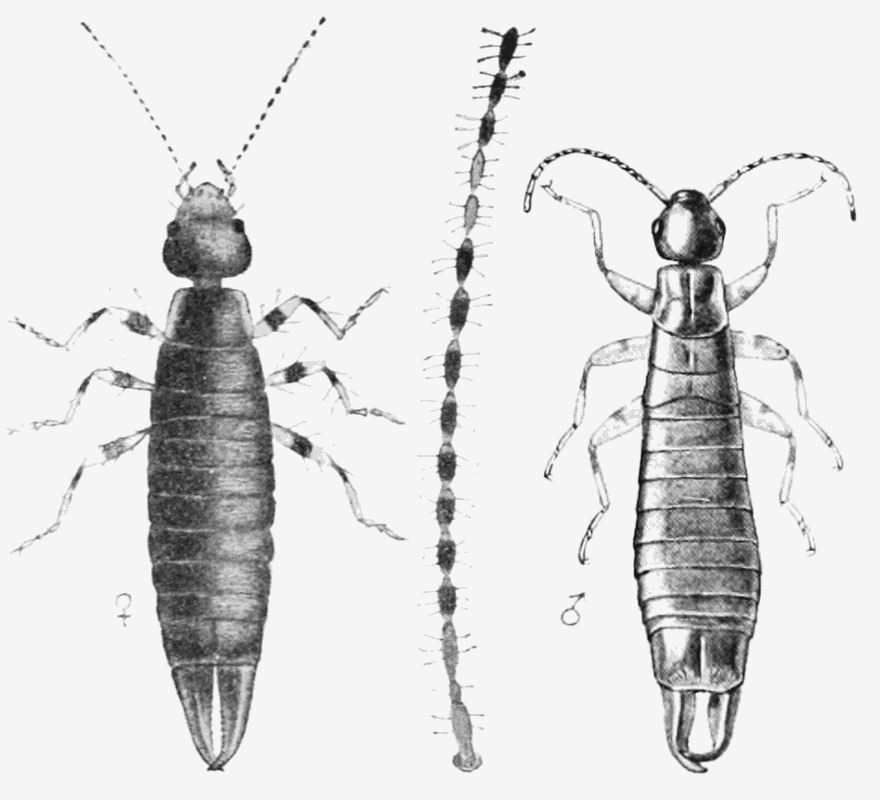

Scientific classification
- Kingdom: Animalia
- Phylum: Arthropoda
- Clade: Pancrustacea
- Class: Insecta
- Order: Dermaptera
- Family: Anisolabididae
- Genus: Euborellia
- Species: E. annulipes

Binomial name
- Euborellia annulipes (H. Lucas, 1847)

= Ringlegged earwig =

Species of earwig

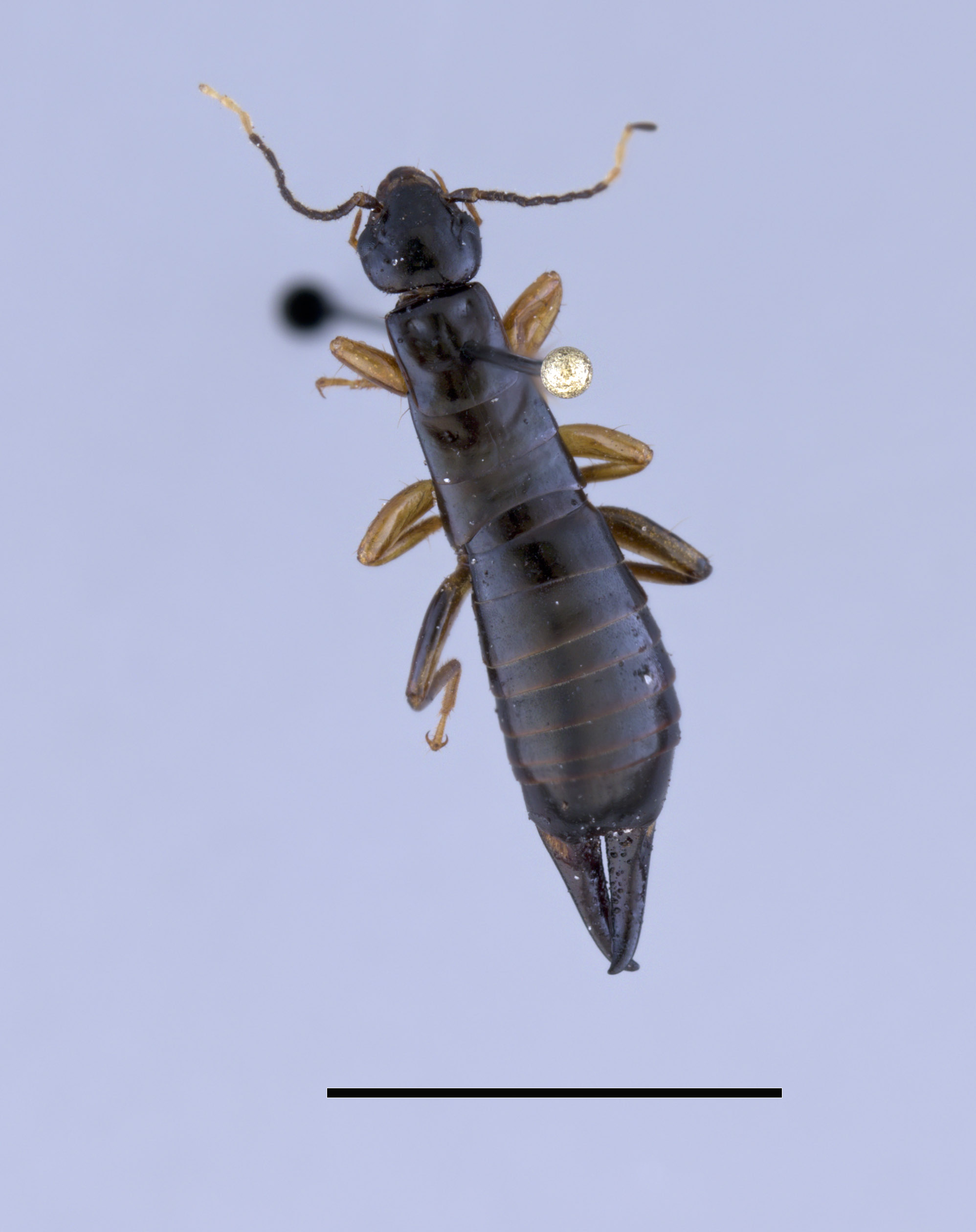
Image of the earwig Euborellia anulipes (H. Lucas, 1847), collected from a soil patch at Elberta Road in Warner Robins, GA. Scale bar represents 1 cm.

The ringlegged earwig (Euborellia annulipes) is a species of earwig in the family Anisolabididae.

== Description ==
Adult Euborellia annulipes are typically dark brown, and 10 mm (0.4 in) to 25 mm (1.0 in) in length. It is a wingless species, and like most earwigs, the females are larger than the males. Their legs are a pale brown color, and have a noticeable dark band around the middle of the femur, or occasionally the tibia, hence their common name. Their antenna generally have sixteen segments, although other numbers are possible.

Their cerci share similar characteristics to most earwigs, as males' cerci are more curved than females'. Further sex differences can be found in the species abdomen: males have ten abdominal segments, while females have eight.

== Discovery and habitat ==
Described by Hippolyte Lucas in 1847, the ringlegged earwig has been known to inhabit the United States since 1902. Over the years, it has obtained a cosmopolitan status, documented all over the world.

The species, like other earwigs, tends to inhabit both tropical and temperate climates.

== Life cycle ==
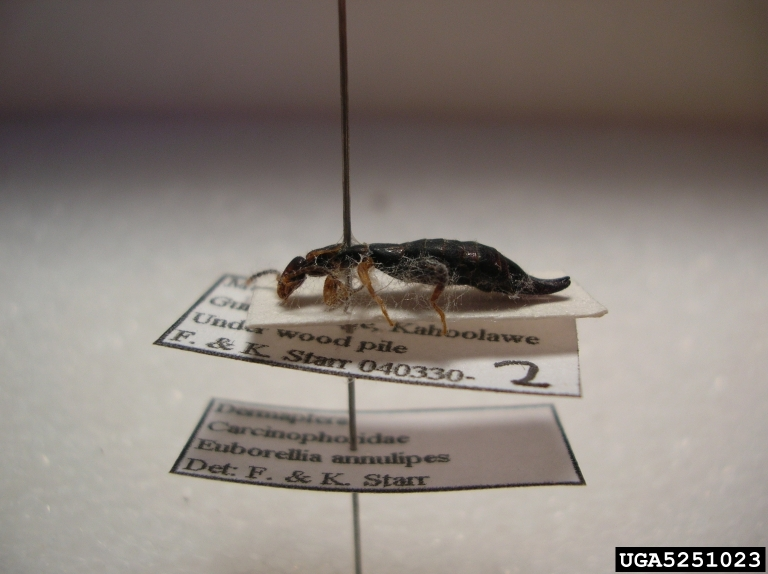
Pinned specimen

Adult females generally lay eggs in batches, with an average of fifty eggs in each batch, and two to four batches. Eggs are laid at different seasons during the year. If laid in the fall, they will usually incubate over the winter, while those laid in spring will incubate for a shorter time before hatching. During the incubation period, the mother guards the eggs, protecting them from predators, and eating any fungi that starts to grow on them.

A few days after being born, nymphs will leave their nest. They resemble adults in shape, except for their smaller size, and absence of wingpads. Also, while the number of abdominal segments varies in adults depending on sex, nymphs always have ten abdominal segments. They will continue to develop for five instars, which will generally last for 45 and 176 days, until they become adults. Approximately 75% of nymphs will develop into females.

The earwigs will mate soon after they reach adulthood, and after a period of approximately eleven days, the eggs are laid. Ringlegged earwigs generally complete two to three generations per year, or one for spring and one for autumn, and a single generation can be completed in 61 days.

Adult ringlegged earwigs can be found throughout the year, except in winter, when they stay underground.
