= Nelumbo aureavallis =

Nelumbo aureavallis Temporal range: Eocene (Ypresian)

Scientific classification
- Kingdom: Plantae
- Clade: Tracheophytes
- Clade: Angiosperms
- Clade: Eudicots
- Order: Proteales
- Family: Nelumbonaceae
- Genus: Nelumbo
- Species: †N. aureavallis

Binomial name
- †Nelumbo aureavallis Hickey, 1977

Extinct species of flowering plant

Nelumbo aureavallis is an extinct species of flowering plants in the lotus family known from Ypresian age Eocene fossils found in western North Dakota, USA.

The species was described from two leaf specimens with reference to four others. The leaves were found at the AMNH fossil localities 14088, 14089, 14091a and 14099, all of which are in the Camels Butte member of the Golden Valley Formation. The Camels Butte member outcrops at a number of sites in western North Dakota, and is designated as the type locality.

The holotype specimen, number USNM 43231, and paratype, number "USNM 43229, are both preserved in the National Museum of Natural History collections of the Smithsonian Institution. The pair of specimens were studied by paleobotanist Leo J. Hickey of the Yale University Geology Department. Dr Hickey published the 1977 type description for N. aureavallis in the Geological Society of America memoir 150, Stratigraphy and Paleobotany of the Golden Valley Formation (Early Tertiary) of Western North Dakota. In the type description the etymology for the specific name aureavallis, "of Golden Valley" was not explicitly specified. Dr Hickey noted the extreme similarity between modern Nelumbo species leaves and those of N. aureavallis.

The leaves of Nelumbo aureavallis are up to 40 millimetres (1.6 in) in diameter with a smooth, slightly wavy margin. The leaf stalk attached to the leaf in the center, from which between thirty-five and forty thick primary veins extend towards the margin. Each of the primary veins branches from one to three times. The secondary veins form a transverse pattern and this, combined with the large number of primaries, distinguish N. aureavallis from extinct Nymphaeaceae genera and warrant its inclusion in Nelumbo. Preserved with, but not attached to the holoype leaf, is a flower bud which is very similar to modern lotus flowers. While not attached, the close proximity to the leaf and the noted similarity allowed for the tentative inclusion of the 2.2 by 1.2 centimetres (0.87 by 0.47 in) bud in N. aureavallis.
