= Ostrinia erythrialis =

Scientific classification
- Kingdom: Animalia
- Phylum: Arthropoda
- Clade: Pancrustacea
- Class: Insecta
- Order: Lepidoptera
- Family: Crambidae
- Genus: Ostrinia
- Species: O. erythrialis

Binomial name
- Ostrinia erythrialis (Hampson, 1913)

Synonyms
- Pionea erythrialis Hampson, 1913; Eupolemarcha incensa Meyrick, 1937; Mecyna endochlora Meyrick, 1935

Species of moth

Ostrinia erythrialis is a moth in the family Crambidae. It was described by George Hampson in 1913. It is found in the Democratic Republic of the Congo, Malawi, Nigeria and South Africa.
