= Ostrinia kurentzovi =

Scientific classification
- Domain: Eukaryota
- Kingdom: Animalia
- Phylum: Arthropoda
- Class: Insecta
- Order: Lepidoptera
- Family: Crambidae
- Genus: Ostrinia
- Species: O. kurentzovi

Binomial name
- Ostrinia kurentzovi Mutuura & Munroe, 1970

Species of moth

Ostrinia kurentzovi is a moth in the family Crambidae. It was described by Akira Mutuura and Eugene G. Munroe in 1970. It is found in the Russian Far East (Ussuri).
