= Ostrinia quadripunctalis =

Scientific classification
- Kingdom: Animalia
- Phylum: Arthropoda
- Clade: Pancrustacea
- Class: Insecta
- Order: Lepidoptera
- Family: Crambidae
- Genus: Ostrinia
- Species: O. quadripunctalis

Binomial name
- Ostrinia quadripunctalis (Denis & Schiffermuller, 1775)

Synonyms
- Pyralis quadripunctalis Denis & Schiffermuller, 1775; Pyrausta quadripunctalis ab. fuscocilialis Rebel & Zerny, 1934

Species of moth

Ostrinia quadripunctalis is a species of moth in the family Crambidae. It is found in Norway, Germany, the Czech Republic, Austria, Italy, Slovakia, Hungary, North Macedonia, Albania, Ukraine and Russia.
