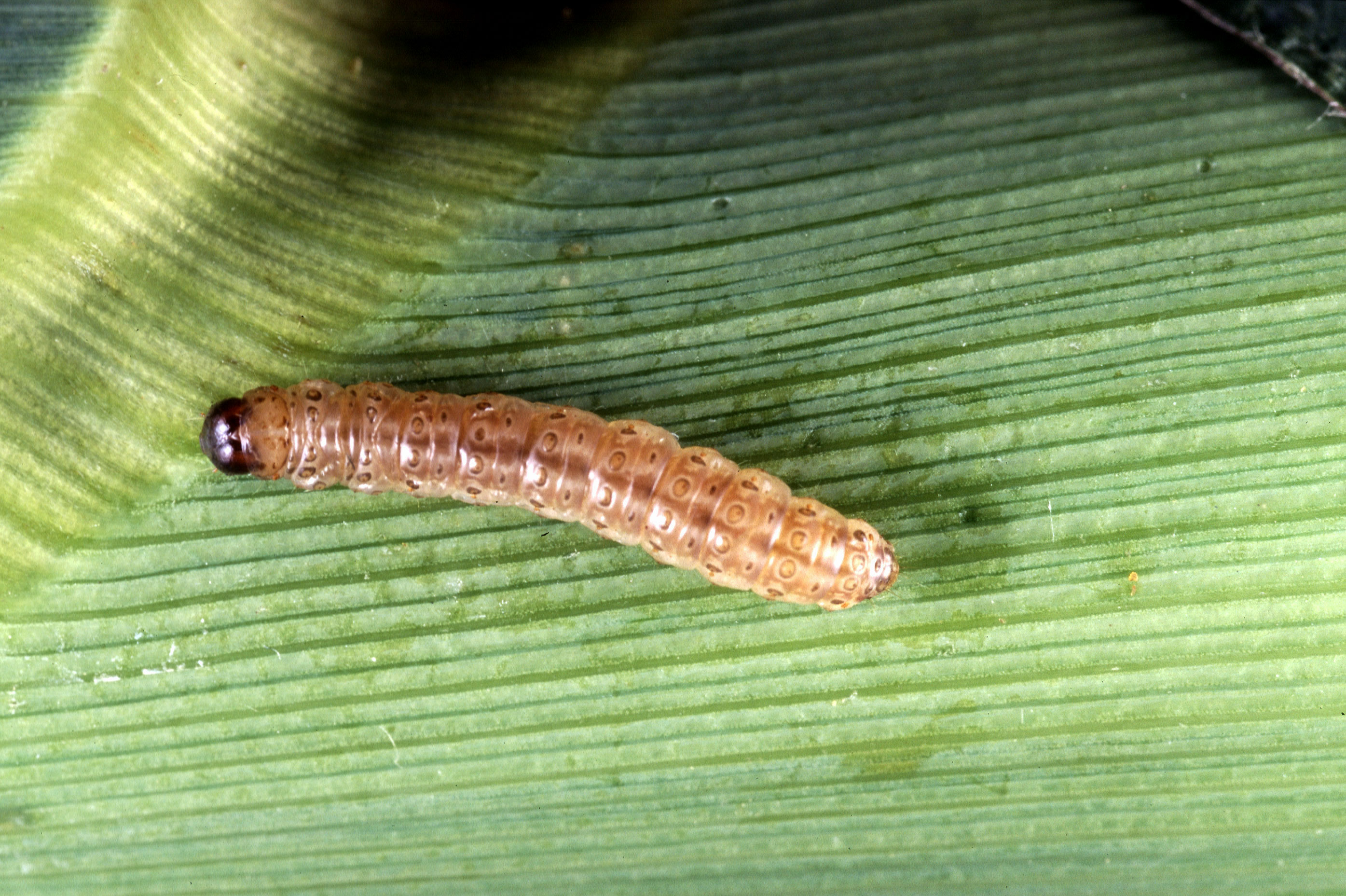
- Ostrinia nubialis

Scientific classification
- Domain: Eukaryota
- Kingdom: Animalia
- Phylum: Arthropoda
- Class: Insecta
- Order: Lepidoptera
- Family: Crambidae
- Subfamily: Pyraustinae
- Tribe: Pyraustini
- Genus: Ostrinia; Hübner, 1825

Synonyms
- Eupolemarcha Meyrick, 1937; Micractis Warren, 1892; Zeaphagus Agenjo, 1952

= Ostrinia =

Genus of moths

Ostrinia is a genus of moths in the family Crambidae described by Jacob Hübner in 1825. Several of them, including the European corn borer, are agricultural pests.

== Species ==
- Ostrinia avarialis Amsel, 1970
- Ostrinia dorsivittata (Moore, 1888)
- Ostrinia erythrialis (Hampson, 1913)
- Ostrinia furnacalis (Guenée, 1854) - Asian corn borer, Asian corn worm
- Ostrinia kasmirica (Moore, 1888)
- Ostrinia kurentzovi Mutuura & Munroe, 1970
- Ostrinia latipennis (Warren, 1892)
- Ostrinia marginalis (Walker, 1866)
- Ostrinia nubilalis (Hübner, 1796) - European corn borer, European corn worm
- Ostrinia obumbratalis (Lederer, 1863) - smartweed borer
- Ostrinia ovalipennis Ohno, 2003
- Ostrinia palustralis (Hübner, 1796)
- Ostrinia penitalis (Grote, 1876) - American lotus borer
- Ostrinia peregrinalis (Eversmann, 1852)
- Ostrinia putzufangensis Mutuura & Munroe, 1970
- Ostrinia quadripunctalis (Denis & Schiffermüller, 1775)
- Ostrinia sanguinealis (Warren, 1892)
- Ostrinia scapulalis (Walker, 1859)
- Ostrinia zaguliaevi Mutuura & Munroe, 1970
- Ostrinia zealis (Guenée, 1854)

== Disputed species ==
- Ostrinia maysalis P. Leraut, 2012, described from France.

== Agricultural problems ==
The Asian corn borer, Ostrinia furnacalis, is one of the biggest pests of maize in Asia, causing 10%-30% of yield losses in the field, and in some cases up to 80% yield loss. These pests carry fungal pathogens (such as Bipolaris maydis and Curvularia lunata) which cause diseases such as maydis leaf blight and curvularia leaf spot in the crop.
