= Ostrinia peregrinalis =

Scientific classification
- Domain: Eukaryota
- Kingdom: Animalia
- Phylum: Arthropoda
- Class: Insecta
- Order: Lepidoptera
- Family: Crambidae
- Genus: Ostrinia
- Species: O. peregrinalis

Binomial name
- Ostrinia peregrinalis (Eversmann, 1852)

Synonyms
- Botys peregrinalis Eversmann, 1852; Botys limitalis Christoph, 1881

Species of moth

Ostrinia peregrinalis is a species of moth in the family Crambidae. It is found in Estonia and Russia.
