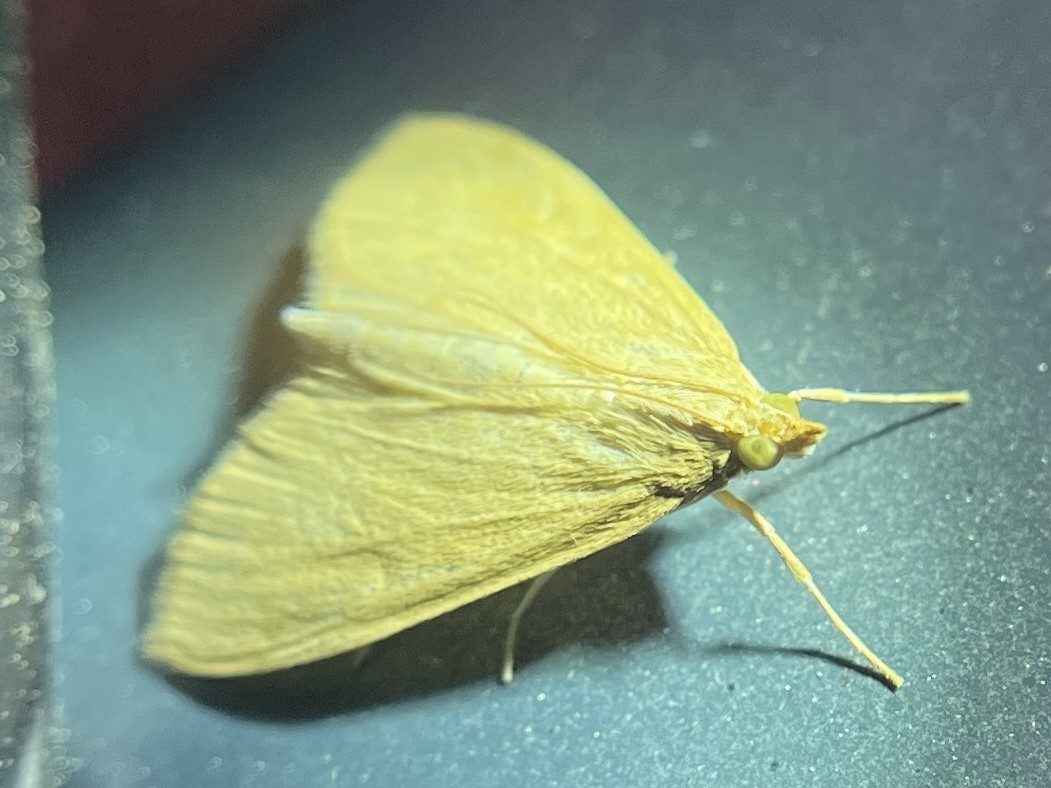

Scientific classification
- Domain: Eukaryota
- Kingdom: Animalia
- Phylum: Arthropoda
- Class: Insecta
- Order: Lepidoptera
- Family: Crambidae
- Genus: Ostrinia
- Species: O. obumbratalis

Binomial name
- Ostrinia obumbratalis (Lederer, 1863)

Synonyms
- Botys obumbratalis Lederer, 1863; Botys obliteralis Walker, 1866; Pyrausta ainsliei Heinrich, 1919

= Ostrinia obumbratalis =

Species of moth

Ostrinia obumbratalis, the smartweed borer, is a species of moth in the family Crambidae. It was first described by Julius Lederer in 1863. It is found in North America, where it has been recorded from New Brunswick and Manitoba to Louisiana and Florida.

The larvae feed on various plants, including Polygonum, Ambrosia, Xanthium and Eupatorium species, as well as Zea mays.
