= Ostrinia ovalipennis =

Scientific classification
- Domain: Eukaryota
- Kingdom: Animalia
- Phylum: Arthropoda
- Class: Insecta
- Order: Lepidoptera
- Family: Crambidae
- Genus: Ostrinia
- Species: O. ovalipennis

Binomial name
- Ostrinia ovalipennis Ohno, 2003

Species of moth

Ostrinia ovalipennis is a moth in the family Crambidae. It was described by Suguru Ohno in 2003. It is found in Japan, where it has been recorded from Honshu and Hokkaido.

Adults have been recorded on wing in July, probably in one generation per year.

The larvae feed on Reynoutria sachalinensis.
