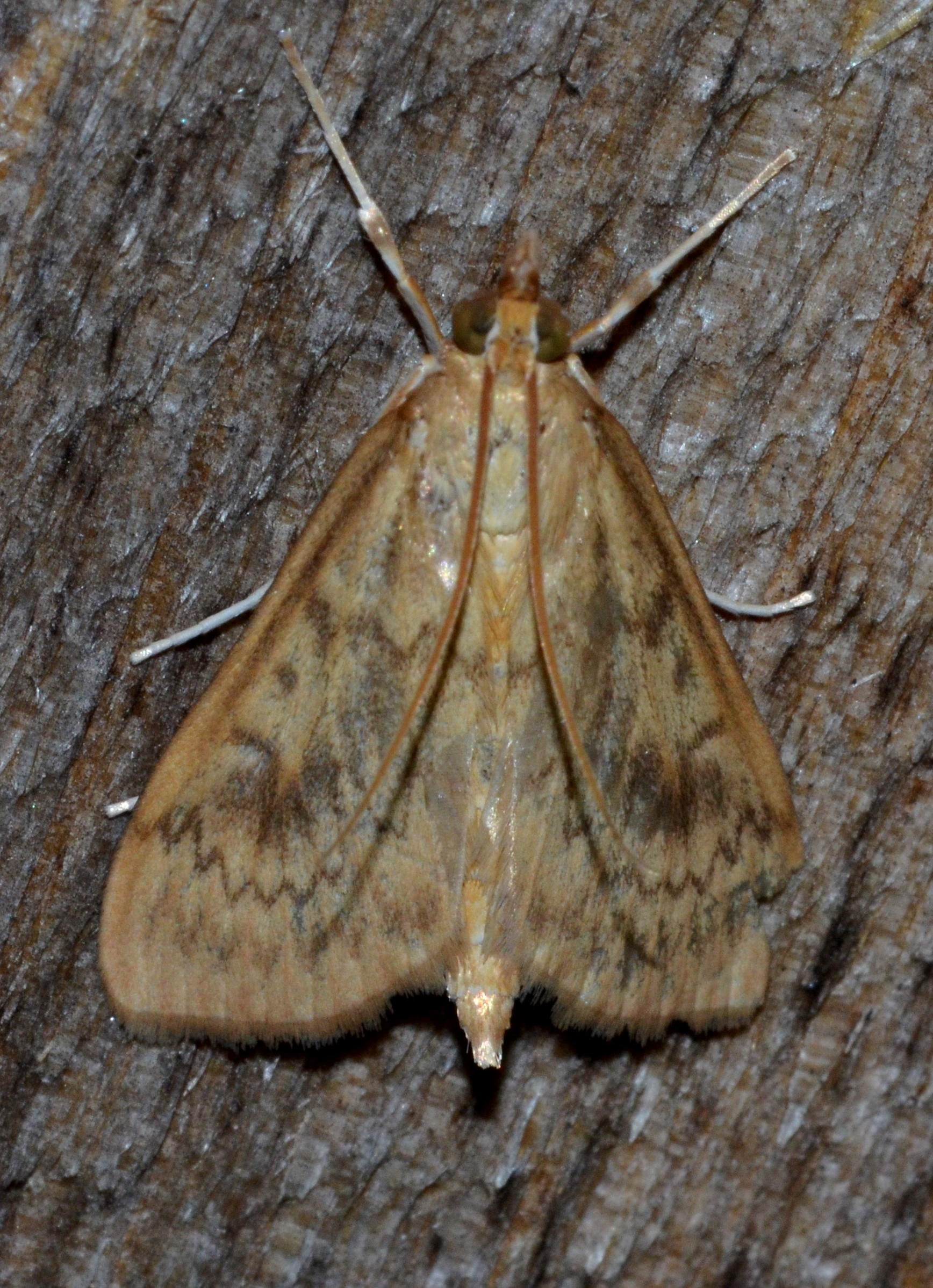

Scientific classification
- Kingdom: Animalia
- Phylum: Arthropoda
- Class: Insecta
- Order: Lepidoptera
- Family: Crambidae
- Genus: Ostrinia
- Species: O. penitalis

Binomial name
- Ostrinia penitalis (Grote, 1876)

Synonyms
- Botys penitalis Grote, 1876; Pyrausta penitalis; Pyrausta nelumbialis Smith, 1890; Pyrausta rubrifusa Hampson, 1913; Tholeria pyraustalis Dyar, 1925

= Ostrinia penitalis =

Species of moth

Ostrinia penitalis, the American lotus borer, is a moth in the family Crambidae. It was described by Augustus Radcliffe Grote in 1876. It is found from Mexico, through Central America to Amazonas, Brazil. It is also found in North America, where it has been recorded from Quebec to British Columbia and most of the United States. The habitat consists of marshes and pondsides.

The wingspan is about 21 mm. Adults have been recorded on wing from May to September in the northern part of the range.

The larvae feed on Nelumbo lutea and Polygonum species. The larvae have a brownish head.

== Subspecies ==
- Ostrinia penitalis penitalis
- Ostrinia penitalis brasiliensis Mutuura & Munroe, 1970 (Brazil)
- Ostrinia penitalis rubrifusa (Hampson, 1913) (Jamaica)
