= Ostrinia latipennis =

Scientific classification
- Domain: Eukaryota
- Kingdom: Animalia
- Phylum: Arthropoda
- Class: Insecta
- Order: Lepidoptera
- Family: Crambidae
- Genus: Ostrinia
- Species: O. latipennis

Binomial name
- Ostrinia latipennis (Warren, 1892)

Synonyms
- Opsibotys latipennis Warren, 1892; Evergestis appendiculata Filipjev, 1927; Micractis albula Mutuura, 1954

Species of moth

Ostrinia latipennis is a moth in the family Crambidae. It was described by Warren in 1892. It is found in Japan and the Russian Far East.

Hostplant: This species feed on Fallopia japonica (Houtt.) Ronse Decr.
