= Ostrinia sanguinealis =

Scientific classification
- Domain: Eukaryota
- Kingdom: Animalia
- Phylum: Arthropoda
- Class: Insecta
- Order: Lepidoptera
- Family: Crambidae
- Genus: Ostrinia
- Species: O. sanguinealis

Binomial name
- Ostrinia sanguinealis (Warren, 1892)

Synonyms
- Micractis sanguinealis Warren, 1892

Species of moth

Ostrinia sanguinealis is a moth in the family Crambidae. It was described by Warren in 1892. It is found in China, Japan and Russia.

== Subspecies ==
- Ostrinia sanguinealis sanguinealis (Japan)
- Ostrinia sanguinealis cathayensis Mutuura & Munroe, 1970 (China)
