= Ostrinia marginalis =

Scientific classification
- Kingdom: Animalia
- Phylum: Arthropoda
- Class: Insecta
- Order: Lepidoptera
- Family: Crambidae
- Genus: Ostrinia
- Species: O. marginalis

Binomial name
- Ostrinia marginalis (Walker, 1866)

Synonyms
- Scopula marginalis Walker, 1866; Botys stenopteralis Grote, 1878

Species of moth

Ostrinia marginalis is a moth in the family Crambidae. It was described by Francis Walker in 1866. It is found in North America, where it has been recorded from Newfoundland and Maine west to Alberta, the Northwest Territories and Yukon. The habitat consists of bogs and marshes.

The wingspan is 15–17 mm.

The larvae feed on Rumex and Polygonum species.
