= Water lily =

Waterlily or waterlilies may refer to:

== Plants ==
- Members of the family Nymphaeaceae
- Formerly, members of the genus Nelumbo (the genus to which lotus belongs)
- Some members of the genus Nymphoides

== Other uses ==
- Water Lilies (Monet series), a series of paintings by Claude Monet
- Water Lilies (film), a 2007 French film
- The Water Lily (film), a 1919 silent film directed by George Ridgwell
- Nénuphar, or The Water Lily, a ballet fantastique in one act, first presented in 1890
- Water Lily Acoustics, a record label
- Water Lily (My Little Pony), a character from the My Little Pony entertainment franchise
- Waterlillies (duo), a musical group
- Waterlily (novel), a 1988 novel by Ella Cara Deloria

== See also ==
- White waterlily (disambiguation)
- Egyptian water lily (disambiguation)
