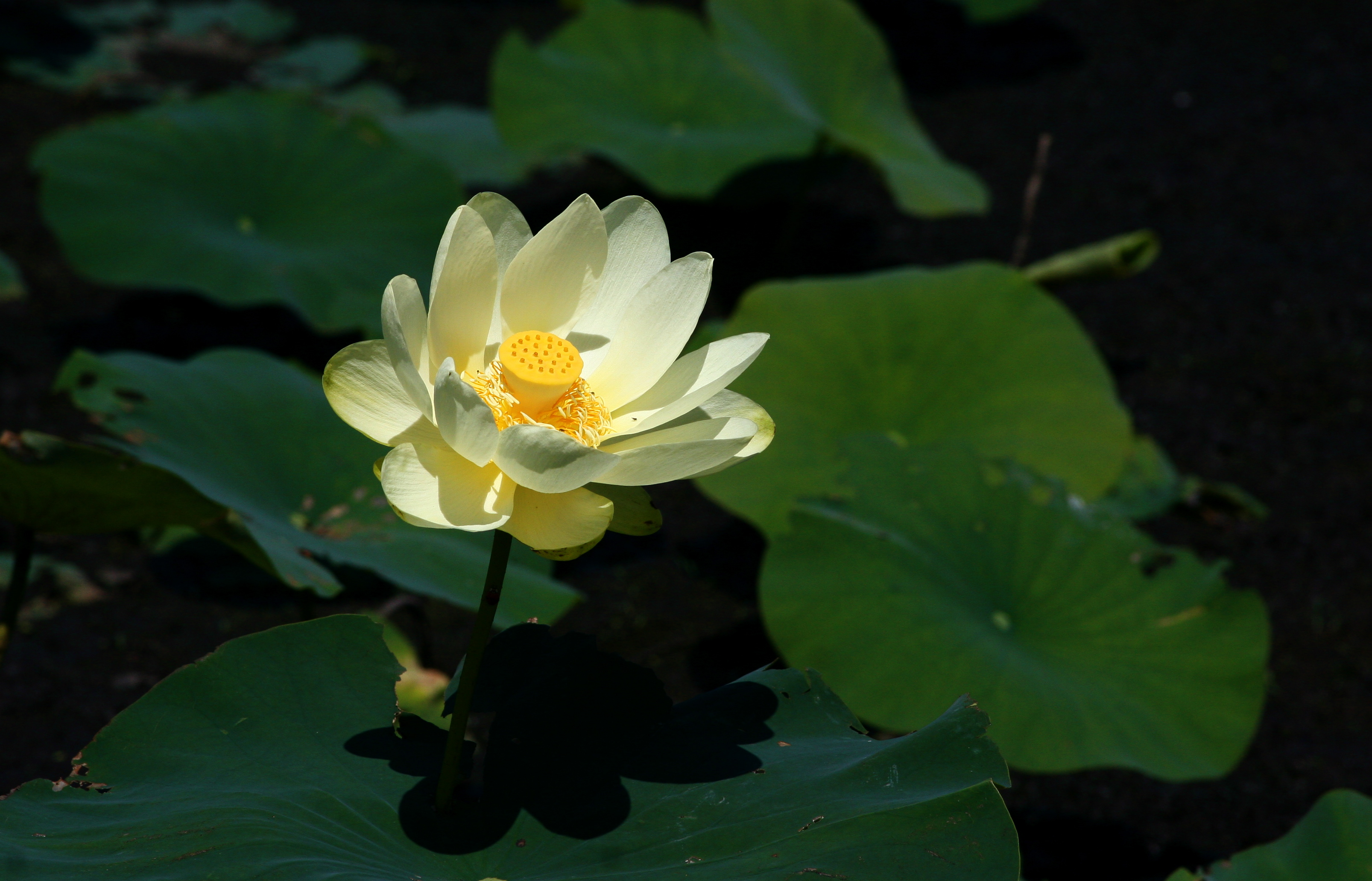

Conservation status
- Apparently Secure (NatureServe)

- Least Concern (IUCN 3.1)

Scientific classification
- Kingdom: Plantae
- Clade: Tracheophytes
- Clade: Angiosperms
- Clade: Eudicots
- Order: Proteales
- Family: Nelumbonaceae
- Genus: Nelumbo
- Species: N. lutea

Binomial name
- Nelumbo lutea (Willd.) Pers.

Synonyms
- Nelumbium luteum Willd.; Nelumbo nucifera subsp. lutea (Willd.) Borsch & Barthlott; Nelumbo nucifera var. lutea (Willd.) Kuntze; Cyamus luteus (Willd.) Nutt.; Nelumbium codophyllum Raf.; Nelumbium jamaicense DC.; Nelumbium pentapetalum (Walter) Willd.; Nelumbium reniforme Willd.; Nelumbo pentapetala (Walter) Fernald; Cyamus flavicomus Salisb.; Cyamus mysticus Salisb.; Cyamus nelumbo Sm.; Cyamus pentapetalus (Walter) Pursh; Cyamus reniformis Pursh; Nymphaea pentapetala Walter

= Nelumbo lutea =

Species of aquatic plant

Nelumbo lutea is a species of flowering plant in the family Nelumbonaceae. Common names include American lotus, yellow lotus, water-chinquapin, and volée. It is native to North America. The botanical name Nelumbo lutea Willd. is the currently recognized name for this species, which has been classified under the former names Nelumbium luteum and Nelumbo pentapetala, among others.

== Description ==
The rhizomes, flowers, and leaves of the American lotus

American lotus is an emergent aquatic plant. It grows in lakes and swamps, as well as areas subject to flooding. The roots are anchored in the mud, but the leaves and flowers emerge above the water's surface. The petioles of the leaves may extend as much as 2 m (6.6 ft) and end in a round leaf blade 33–43 cm (13–17 in) in diameter. Mature plants range in height from 0.8 to 1.5 m (2.6 to 4.9 ft).

Flowering begins in late spring and may continue into the summer. The specific name means "yellow" in Latin and refers to the flowers, which may be white to pale yellow. The flowers measure 18–28 cm (7.1–11.0 in) in diameter and have 22-25 petals.

== Ecology ==
It is the larval host plant of the American lotus borer, Ostrinia penitalis.

== Conservation status ==
Nelumbo lutea populations are declining in the U.S. due to habitat destruction. It has been listed as threatened or endangered in New Jersey, Michigan, and Pennsylvania, and extirpated in Delaware. Their populations have a low level of genetic diversity, showing variation among different populations rather than within populations.

== Range ==
The native distribution of the species is Minnesota to Oklahoma, Florida, Mexico, Honduras, and the Caribbean.

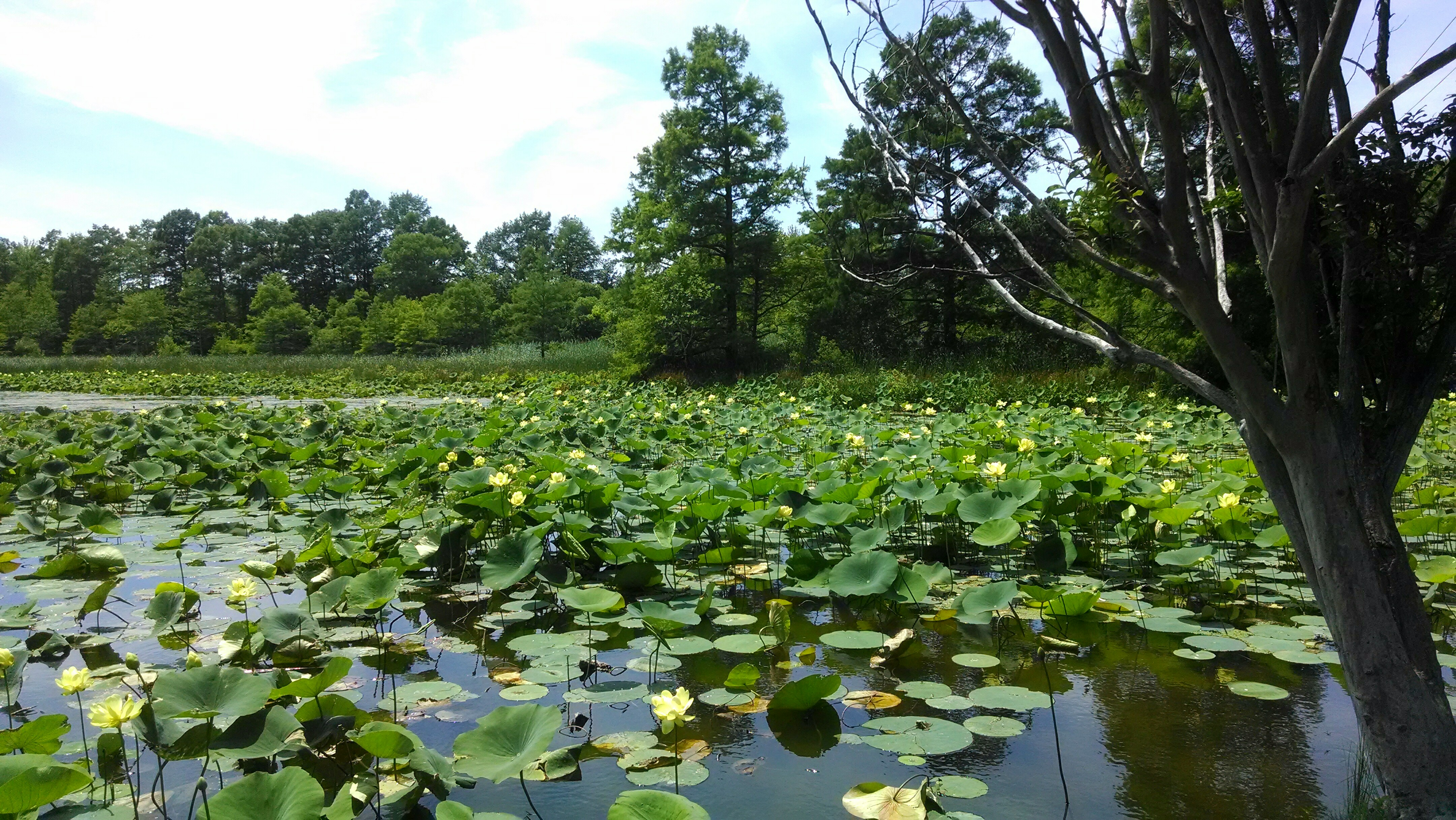
Native American Lotus in Virginia Beach, Virginia

Indigenous communities, who utilized the plant as a source of food and medicine, likely expanded its distribution northward and eastward across the continent.

== Uses ==
N. lutea may be the plant called "macoupin" in the Miami-Illinois language. This plant has a large tuberous rhizome that is used as a food source. The seed is also edible and is known as "alligator corn". The seed-like fruits can be shaken loose, and are also edible. The unopened leaves and young stalks can be cooked.

For the Wyandot people, the plant was mixed with acorns for food during times of famine. The Meskwaki had the plants seeds cooked with corn, and for winter-time food used terminal shoots cut crosswise, strung on string, and dried.

The species is also widely planted in ponds as an ornamental plant; for its foliage and flowers. American Lotus spreads via creeping rhizomes and seeds. This species has been crossed with N. nucifera to create many hybrids. Seeds may be propagated by scarifying the pointed tip of the seed with a file then soaking in water. Propagation is also possible by division of established plants.

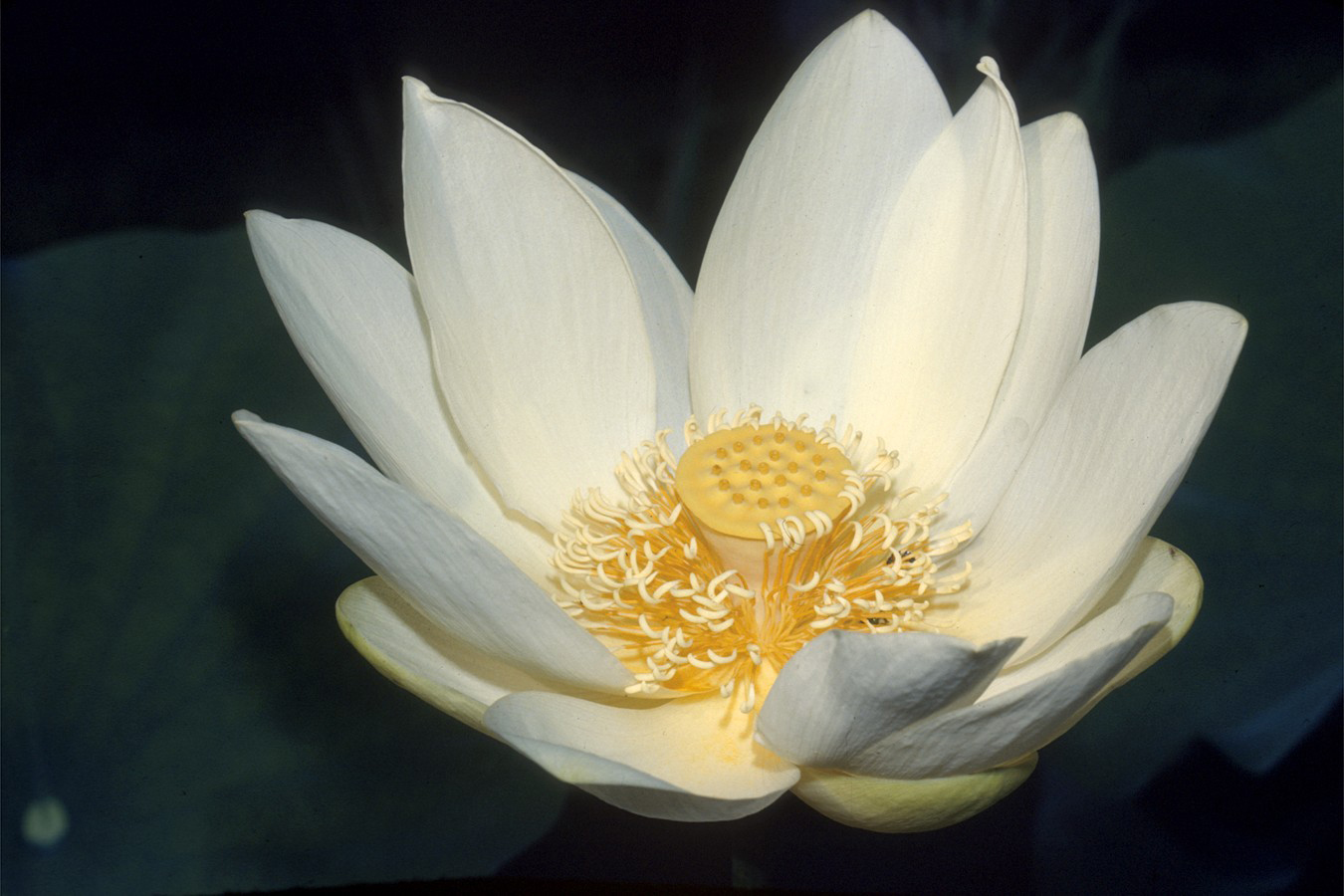
White flower

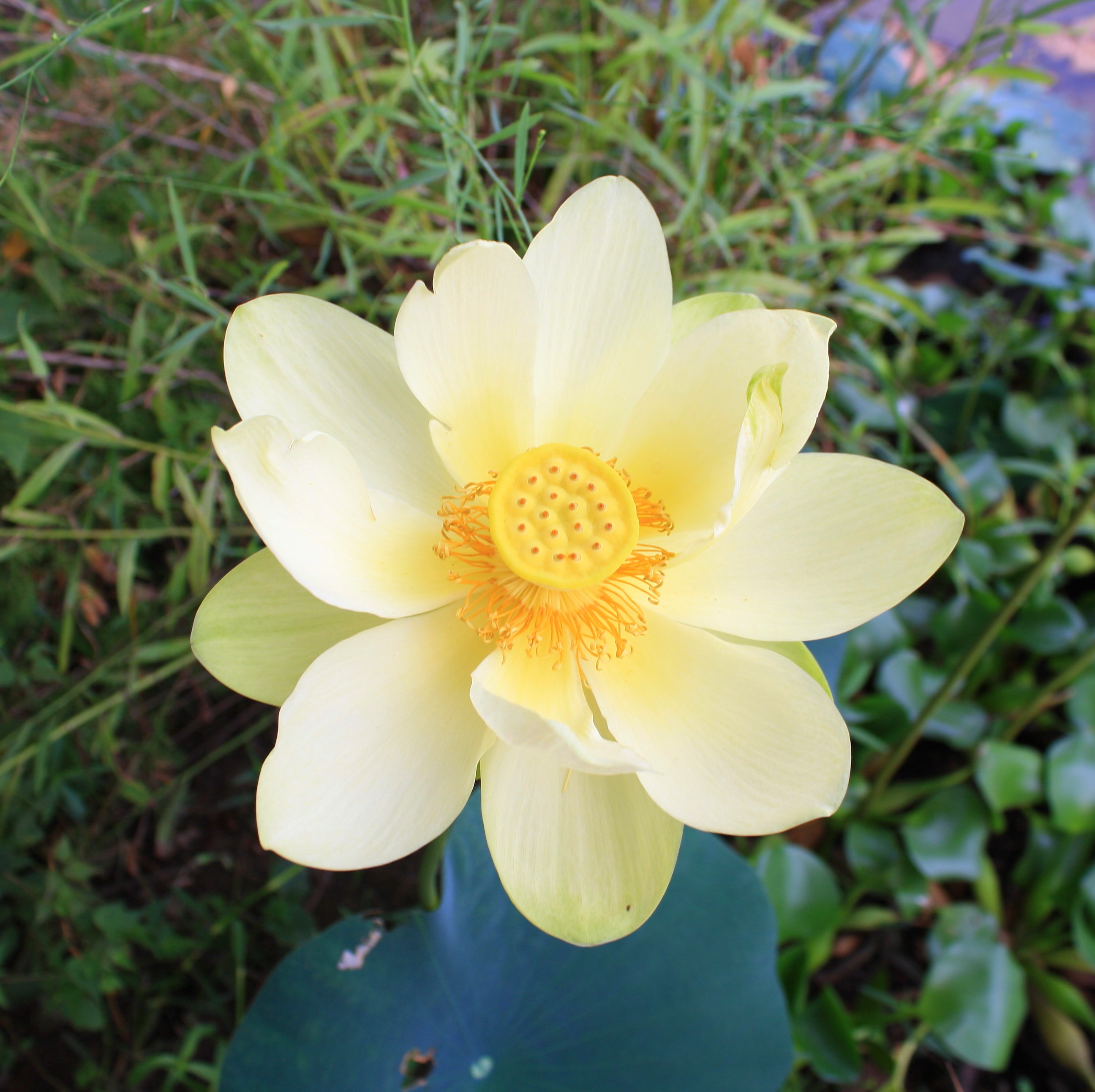
Yellow flower

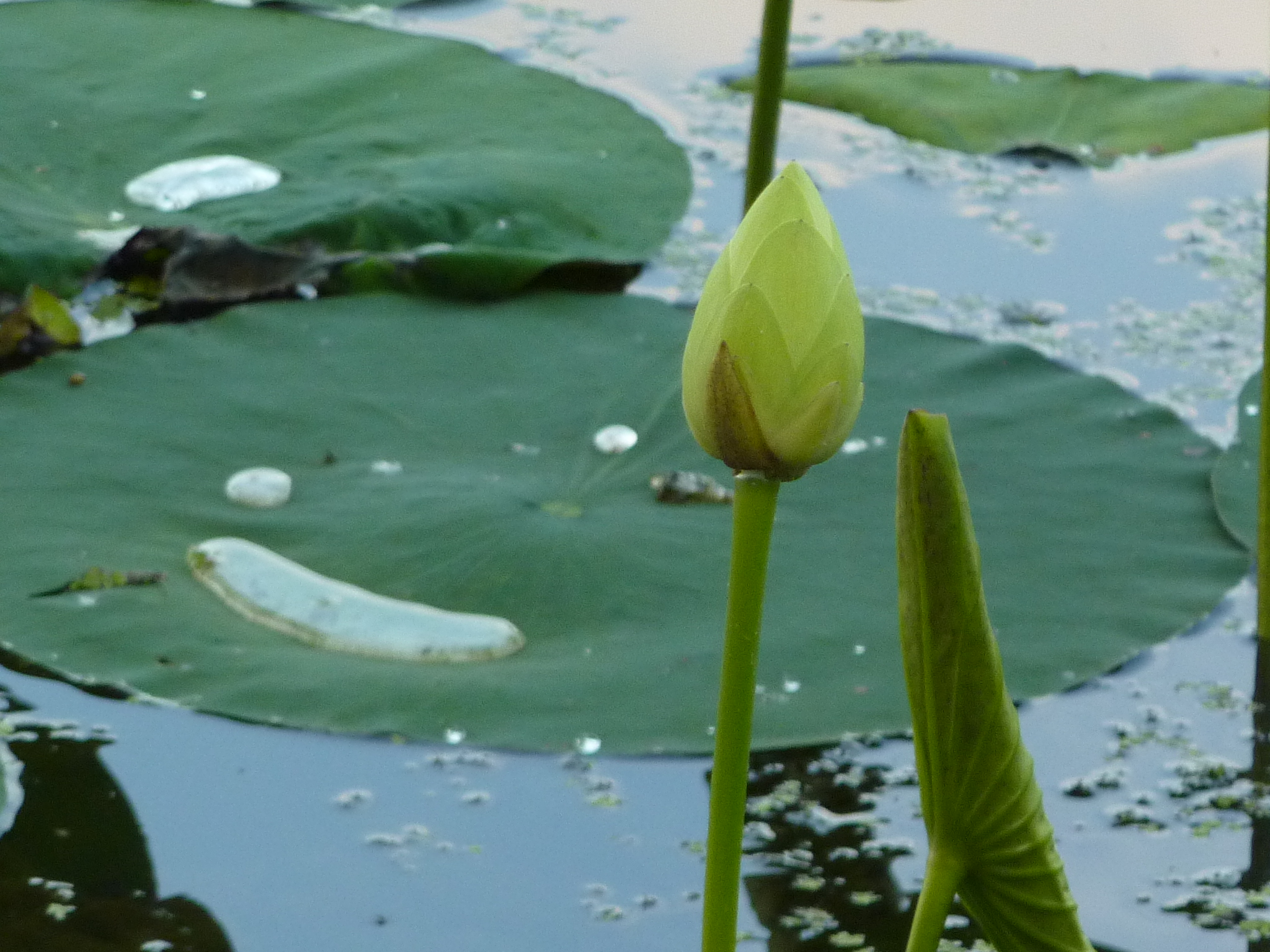
Leaf and flower bud

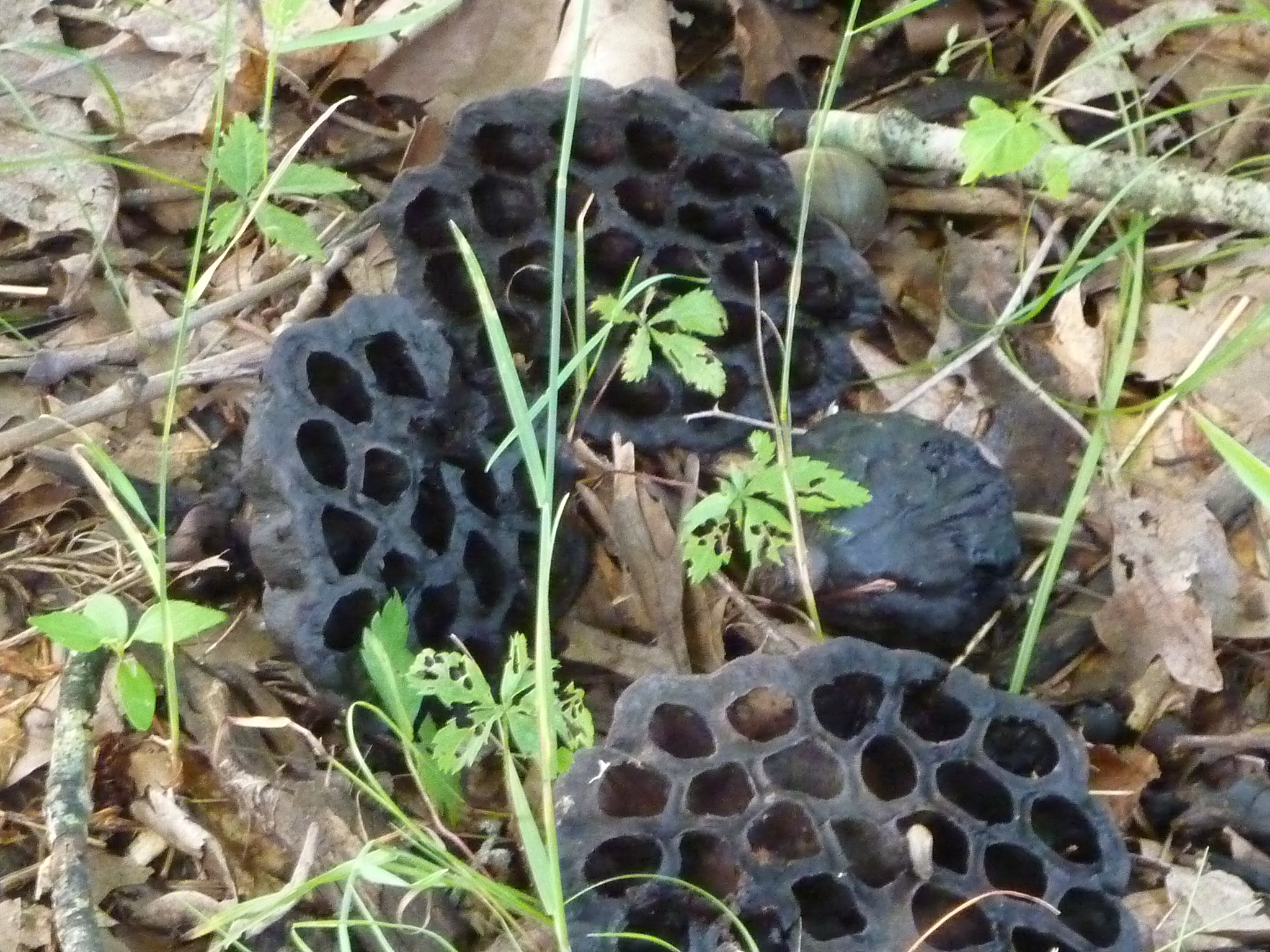
Empty seed pods
