= Ostrinia dorsivittata =

Scientific classification
- Domain: Eukaryota
- Kingdom: Animalia
- Phylum: Arthropoda
- Class: Insecta
- Order: Lepidoptera
- Family: Crambidae
- Genus: Ostrinia
- Species: O. dorsivittata

Binomial name
- Ostrinia dorsivittata (Moore, 1888)

Synonyms
- Hapalia dorsivittata Moore, 1888

Species of moth

Ostrinia dorsivittata is a moth in the family Crambidae. It was described by Frederic Moore in 1888. It is found in Darjeeling, India and China.
