= Ostrinia kasmirica =

Scientific classification
- Domain: Eukaryota
- Kingdom: Animalia
- Phylum: Arthropoda
- Class: Insecta
- Order: Lepidoptera
- Family: Crambidae
- Genus: Ostrinia
- Species: O. kasmirica

Binomial name
- Ostrinia kasmirica (Moore, 1888)

Synonyms
- Hapalia kasmirica Moore, 1888

Species of moth

Ostrinia kasmirica is a moth in the family Crambidae. It was described by Frederic Moore in 1888. It is found in Kashmir and Russia.

== Subspecies ==
- Ostrinia kasmirica kasmirica (Kashmir)
- Ostrinia kasmirica eurasiatica Mutuura & Munroe, 1970 (Russia)
