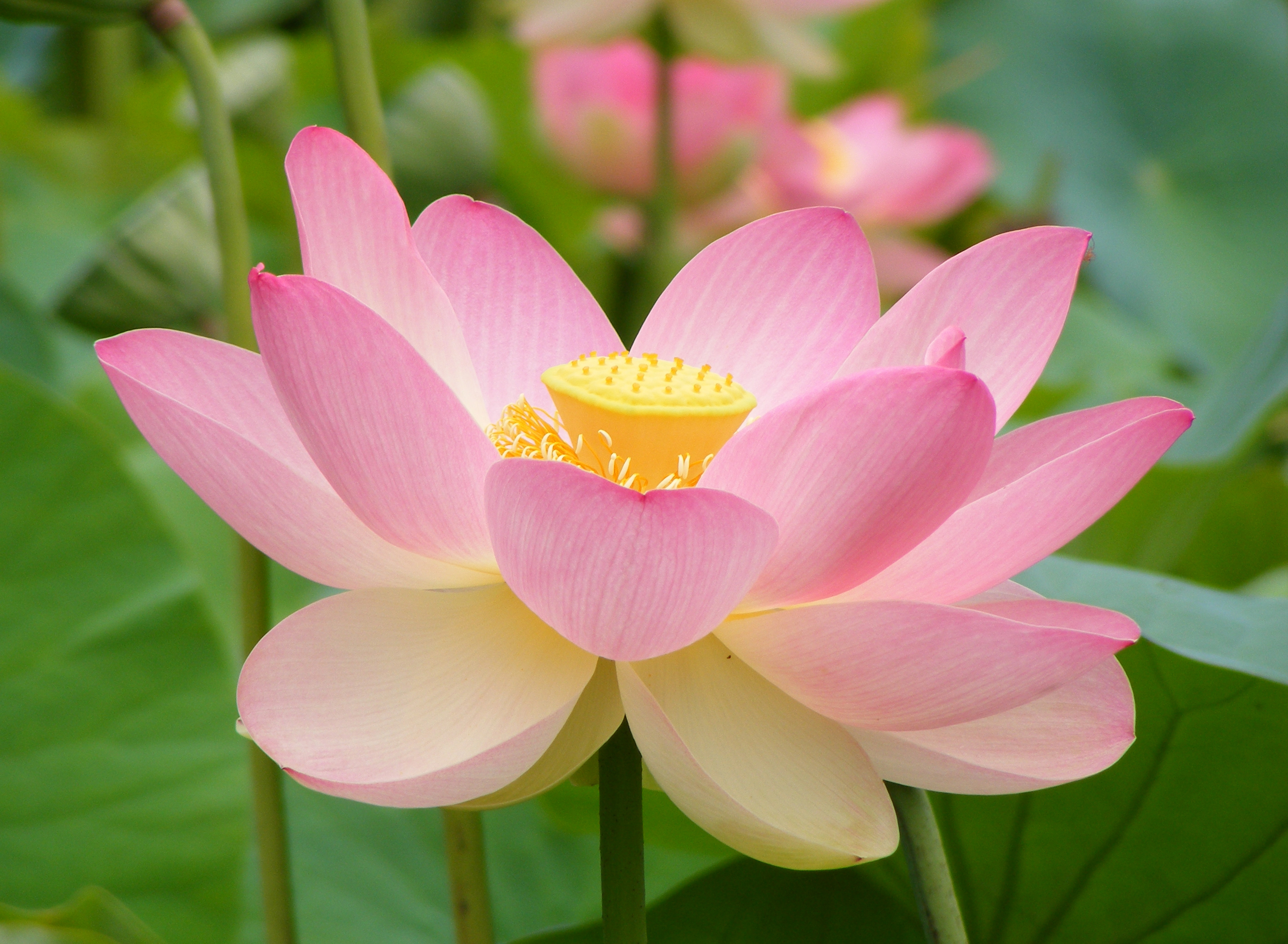
- Nelumbo nucifera (sacred lotus)
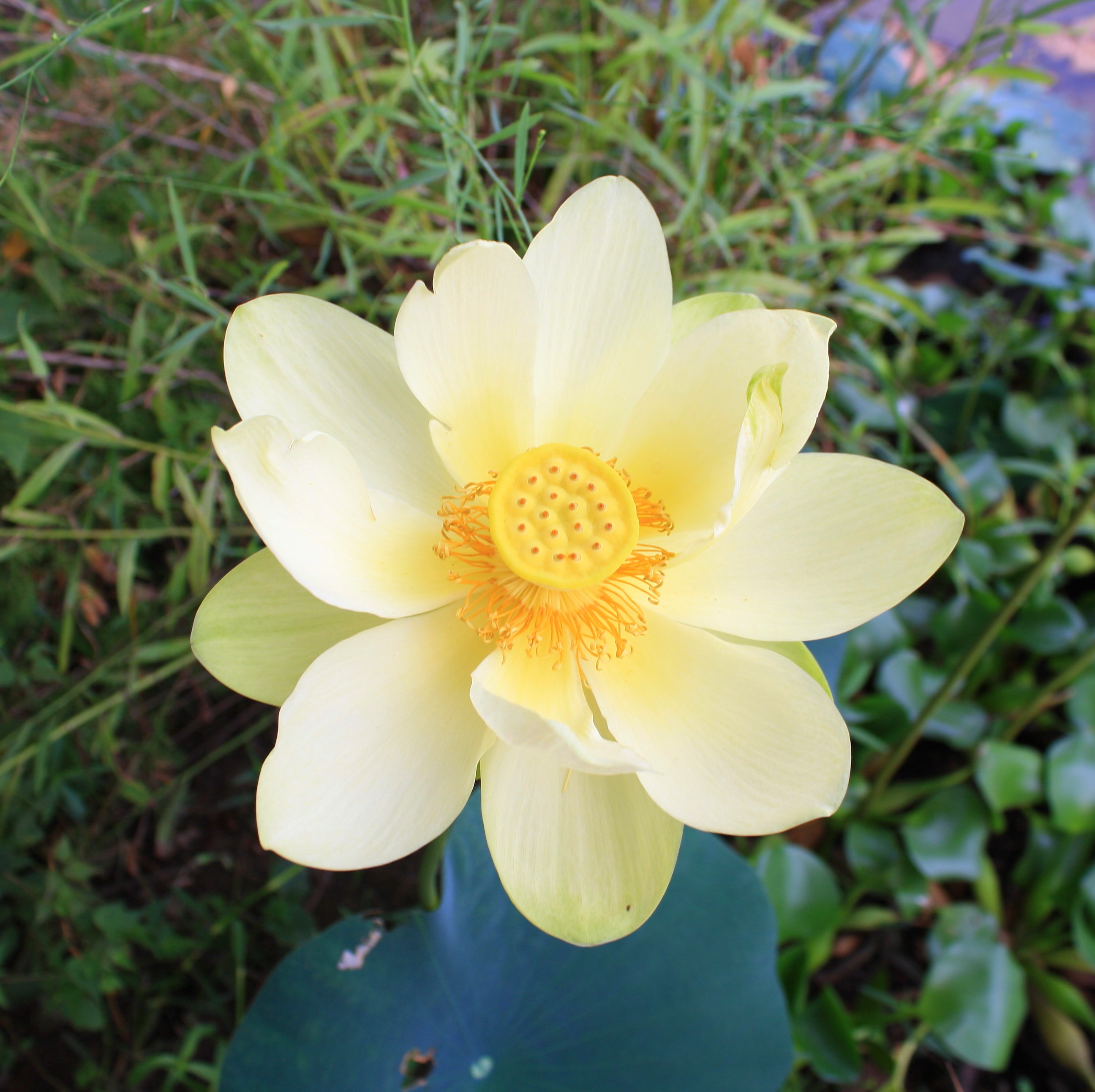
- Nelumbo lutea (American lotus)

Scientific classification
- Kingdom: Plantae
- Clade: Tracheophytes
- Clade: Angiosperms
- Clade: Eudicots
- Order: Proteales
- Family: Nelumbonaceae
- Genus: Nelumbo; Adans.

Species
- Nelumbo lutea; Nelumbo nucifera; †Nelumbo aureavallis; †Nelumbo changchangensis; †Nelumbo minima; †Nelumbo nipponica; †Nelumbo orientalis; †Nelumbo protolutea; 30+ more from fossil remains

= Nelumbo =

Nelumbo Temporal range: Albian to present

Genus of aquatic flowering plants known as "lotus."

Nelumbo /nɪˈlʌmboʊ/ is a genus of aquatic plants with large, showy flowers. Members are commonly called lotus, though the name is also applied to various other plants and plant groups, including the unrelated genus Lotus. Members outwardly resemble those in the family Nymphaeaceae ("water lilies"), but Nelumbo is actually very distant from that family.

Nelumbo is an ancient genus, with dozens of species known from fossil remains since the Early Cretaceous. However, there are only two known living species of lotus. One is the better-known Nelumbo nucifera, which is native to East Asia, South Asia, Southeast Asia, and probably Australia and is commonly cultivated for consumption and use in traditional Chinese medicine. The other lotus is Nelumbo lutea, which is native to North America and the Caribbean. Horticultural hybrids have been produced between these two allopatric species.

== Description ==
=== Ultrahydrophobicity ===
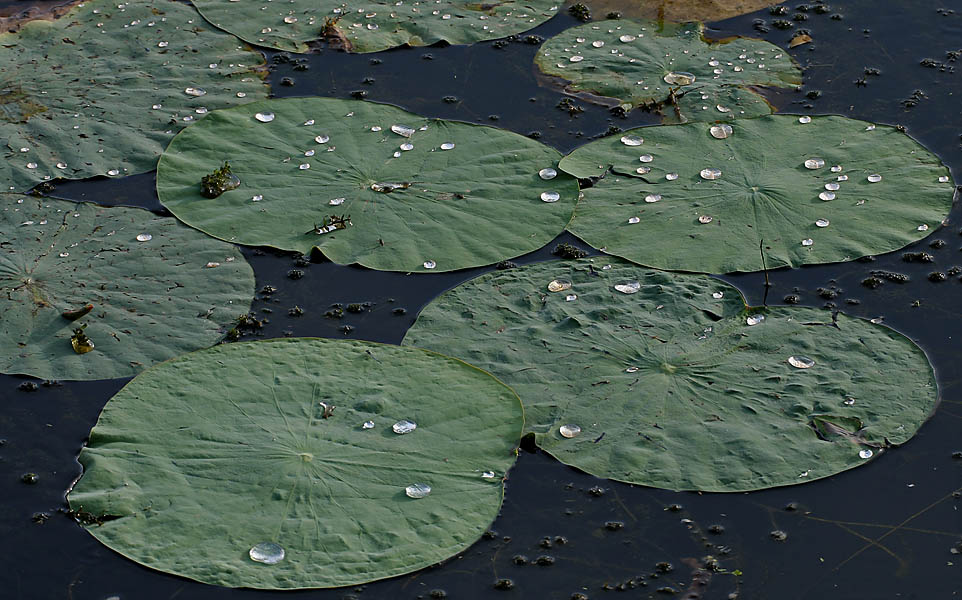
Foliage of N. nucifera: an example of the lotus effect after rain

The leaves of Nelumbo are highly water-repellent (i.e. they exhibit ultrahydrophobicity) and have given the name to what is called the lotus effect. Ultrahydrophobicity involves two criteria: a very high water contact angle between the droplet of water and the leaf surface, and a very low roll-off angle. This means that the water must contact the leaf surface at exactly one, minuscule point, and any manipulation of the leaf by changing its angle will result in the water droplet rolling off of the leaf. Ultrahydrophobicity is conferred by the usually dense layer of papillae on the surface of the Nelumbo leaves, and the small, robust, waxy tubules that protrude off each papilla. This helps reduce the area of contact between the water droplet and the leaf.

Ultrahydrophobicity is said to confer a very important evolutionary advantage. As an aquatic plant with leaves that rest on the water's surface, the genus Nelumbo is characterized by its concentration of stomata on the upper epidermis of its leaves, unlike most other plants which concentrate their stomata on the lower epidermis, underneath the leaf. The collection of water on the upper epidermis, whether that be by rain, mist, or the nearby disturbance of water, is very detrimental to the leaf's ability to perform gas exchange through its stomata. Thus, Nelumbo's ultrahydrophobicity allows the water droplets to accumulate together very quickly, and then roll off of the leaf very easily at the slightest disturbance of the leaf, a process which allows its stomata to function normally without restriction due to blockage by water droplets.

=== Thermoregulation ===
An uncommon property of the genus Nelumbo is that it can generate heat, which it does by using the alternative oxidase pathway (AOX). This pathway involves a different, alternative exchange of electrons from the usual pathway that electrons follow when generating energy in mitochondria.

The typical pathway in plant mitochondria involves cytochrome complexes. The pathway used to generate heat in Nelumbo involves cyanide-resistant alternative oxidase, which is a different electron acceptor than the usual cytochrome complexes. The plant also reduces ubiquitin concentrations while in thermogenesis, which allows the AOX in the plant to function without degradation. Thermogenesis is restricted to the receptacle, stamen, and petals of the flower, but each of these parts produce heat independently without relying on the heat production in other parts of the flower.

There are several theories about the function of thermogenesis, especially in an aquatic genus such as Nelumbo. The most common theory posits that thermogenesis in flowers attracts pollinators, for a variety of reasons. Heated flowers may attract insect pollinators. As the pollinators warm themselves while resting inside the flower, they deposit and pick up pollen onto and from the flower. The thermogenic environment might also be conducive to pollinator mating; pollinators may require a certain temperature for reproduction. By providing an ideal thermogenic environment, the flower is pollinated by mating pollinators. Others theorize that heat production facilitates the release of volatile compounds into the air to attract pollinators flying over water, or that the heat is recognizable in the dark by thermo-sensitive pollinators. None have been conclusively proven to be more plausible than the others.

After anthesis, the receptacle of the lotus transitions from a primarily thermogenic to a photosynthetic structure, as seen in the rapid and dramatic increase in photosystems, photosynthetically involved pigments, electron transport rates, and the presence of 13^{C} in the receptacle and petals, all of which assist in increasing photosynthesis rates. After this transition, all thermogenesis in the flower is lost. Pollinators do not need to be attracted once the ovary is fertilized, and thus the receptacle's resources are better used when it is photosynthesizing to produce carbohydrates that can increase plant biomass or fruit mass.

Other plants utilize thermoregulation in their life cycles. Among these is the eastern skunk cabbage, which heats itself to melt any ice above it, and push through the ground in early spring. Also, the elephant yam, which heats its flowers to attract pollinators. In addition, the carrion flower, which heats itself to disperse water vapor through the air, carrying its scent further, thus attracting more pollinators.

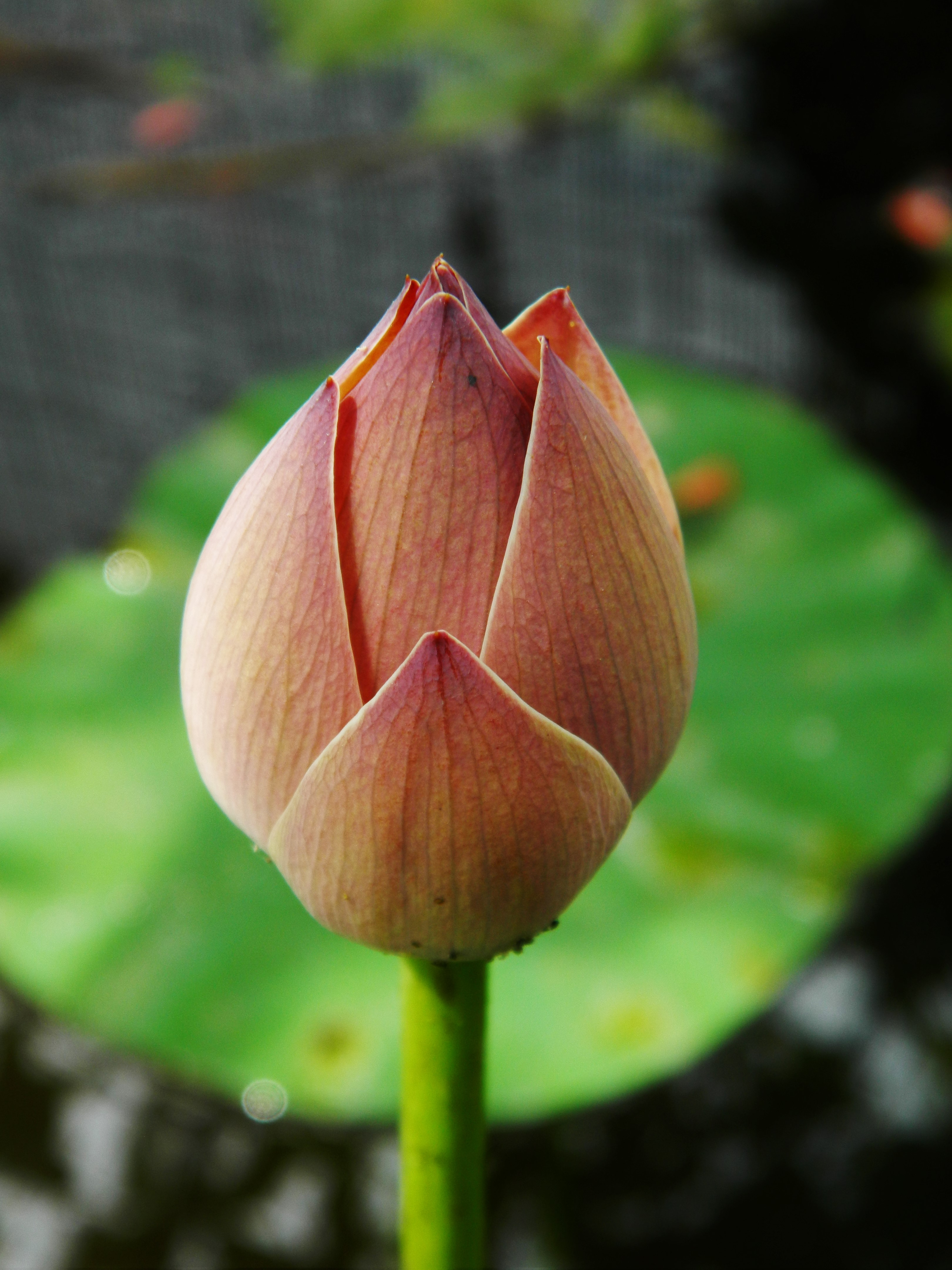
Nelumbo nucifera bud

=== Similar species ===
The leaves of Nelumbo can be distinguished from those of genera in the family Nymphaeaceae as they are peltate, that is they have fully circular leaves. Nymphaea, on the other hand, has a single characteristic notch from the edge in to the center of the lily pad. The seedpod of Nelumbo is very distinctive.

== Taxonomy ==
=== Taxonomic history ===
The Cronquist system of 1981 recognizes the family Nelumbonaceae but places it in the water lily order Nymphaeales. The Dahlgren system of 1985 and Thorne system of 1992 both recognize the family and place it in its own order, Nelumbonales. The United States Department of Agriculture still classifies the lotus family within the water lily order.

There is residual disagreement over which family the genus should be placed in. Traditional classification systems recognized Nelumbo as part of the Nymphaeaceae, but traditional taxonomists were likely misled by convergent evolution associated with an evolutionary shift from a terrestrial to an aquatic lifestyle. In the older classification systems it was recognized under the order Nymphaeales or Nelumbonales.

=== Modern classification ===
Nelumbo is currently recognized as the only living genus in Nelumbonaceae, one of several distinctive families in the eudicot order of the Proteales. Its closest living relatives, the (Proteaceae and Platanaceae), are shrubs or trees, suggesting that its ancestors were woody plants that transitioned to a water habitat. Notocyamus fossils support this theory.

The APG IV system of 2016 recognizes Nelumbonaceae as a distinct family and places it in the order Proteales in the eudicot clade, as do the earlier APG III and APG II systems.

=== Phylogeny ===
There are several fossil species known from Cretaceous, Paleogene, and Neogene-aged strata throughout Eurasia and North America. Despite the ancient origins of this genus and the wide geographic separation of the two extant species (N. nucifera and N. lutea), phylogenetic evidence indicates that they diverged rather recently, during the early Pleistocene (about 2 million years ago).

=== Species ===
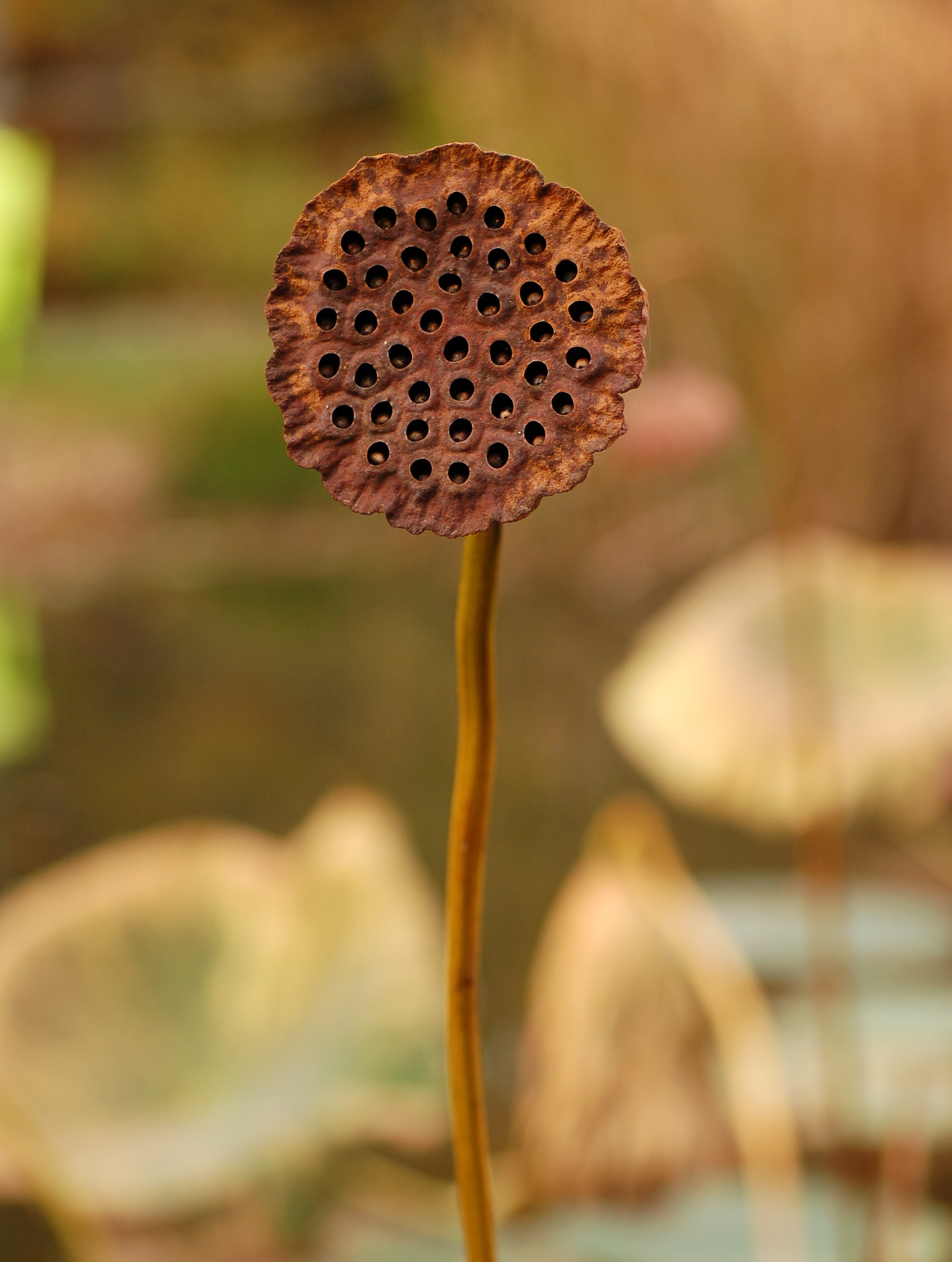
Dried seed pod from Nelumbo 'Mrs. Perry D. Slocum', a cross between the two extant species

==== Extant species ====
- Nelumbo lutea Willd. – American lotus (Eastern United States, Mexico, Greater Antilles, Honduras)
- Nelumbo nucifera Gaertn. – sacred or Indian lotus, also known as the Rose of India and the sacred water lily of Hinduism and Buddhism. It is the national flower of India and Vietnam. Its roots and seeds are also used widely in cooking in East Asia, South Asia and Southeast Asia.

==== Fossil species ====
Nearly 30 fossil species are known from the mid-Cretaceous to the present.

- †Nelumbo aureavallis Hickey – Eocene (North Dakota), described from leaves found in the Golden Valley Formation in North Dakota, USA.
- †Nelumbo changchangensis Eocene, (Hainan Island, China), described from several fossils of leaves, seedpods, and rhizomes from the Eocene-aged strata in the Changchang Basin, of Hainan Island.
- †Nelumbo choffati Early Cretaceous (Portugal), leaves known from the Albian. One of the earliest known species.
- †Nelumbo jiayinensis Late Cretaceous, (Heilongjiang, China), leaves described from the Santonian-aged Yong'ancun Formation
- †Nelumbo lusitanica Early Cretaceous (Portugal), leaves known from the Albian. One of the earliest known species.
- †Nelumbo minima Pliocene (Netherlands), described from leaves and seedpods that suggest a very small plant. Originally described as a member of the genus Nelumbites, as "Nelumbites minimus."
- †Nelumbo nipponica Eocene-Miocene, fossil leaves are known from Eocene-aged strata in Japan, and Miocene-aged strata in Russia.
- †Nelumbo orientalis Cretaceous (Japan), fossils found in Cretaceous-aged strata of Japan. The Sarao Formation, which they are known from, was formerly considered of Early Cretaceous age, but more recent studies support a Maastrichtian age for it.
- †Nelumbo protolutea Eocene (Mississippi), fossils of leaves strongly suggest a plant similar in form to the American lotus.
- †Nelumbo weymouthi Early Cretaceous (Wyoming, US), leaves known from the Albian. One of the earliest known species.

=== Etymology ===
The genus name is derived from Sinhala: නෙළුම් neḷum, the name for Nelumbo nucifera.

== Uses ==
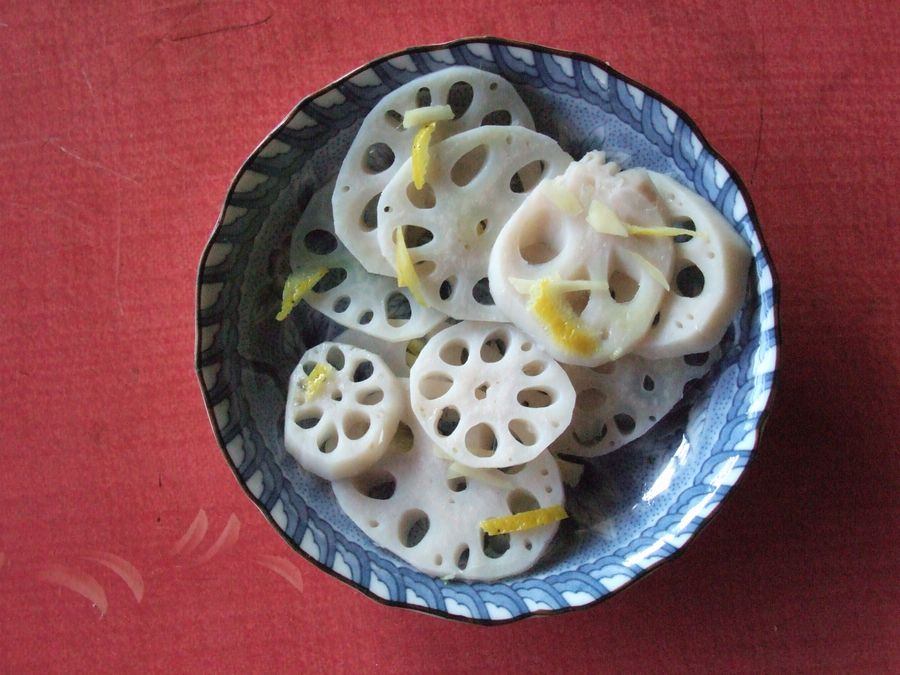
Vinegared lotus root slices with ginger and citron as eaten in Japan

The entire plant can be eaten either raw or cooked. The underwater portion is high in starch. The fleshy parts can be dug from the mud and baked or boiled. The young leaves can be boiled. The seeds are palatable and can be eaten raw or dried and ground into flour. The stem fibers are also used to make lotus silk.

== Culture ==
The sacred lotus, N. nucifera, is sacred in both Hinduism and Buddhism. It is the floral emblem of both India and Vietnam.
